= Motor oil =

Lubricant used for internal combustion engines

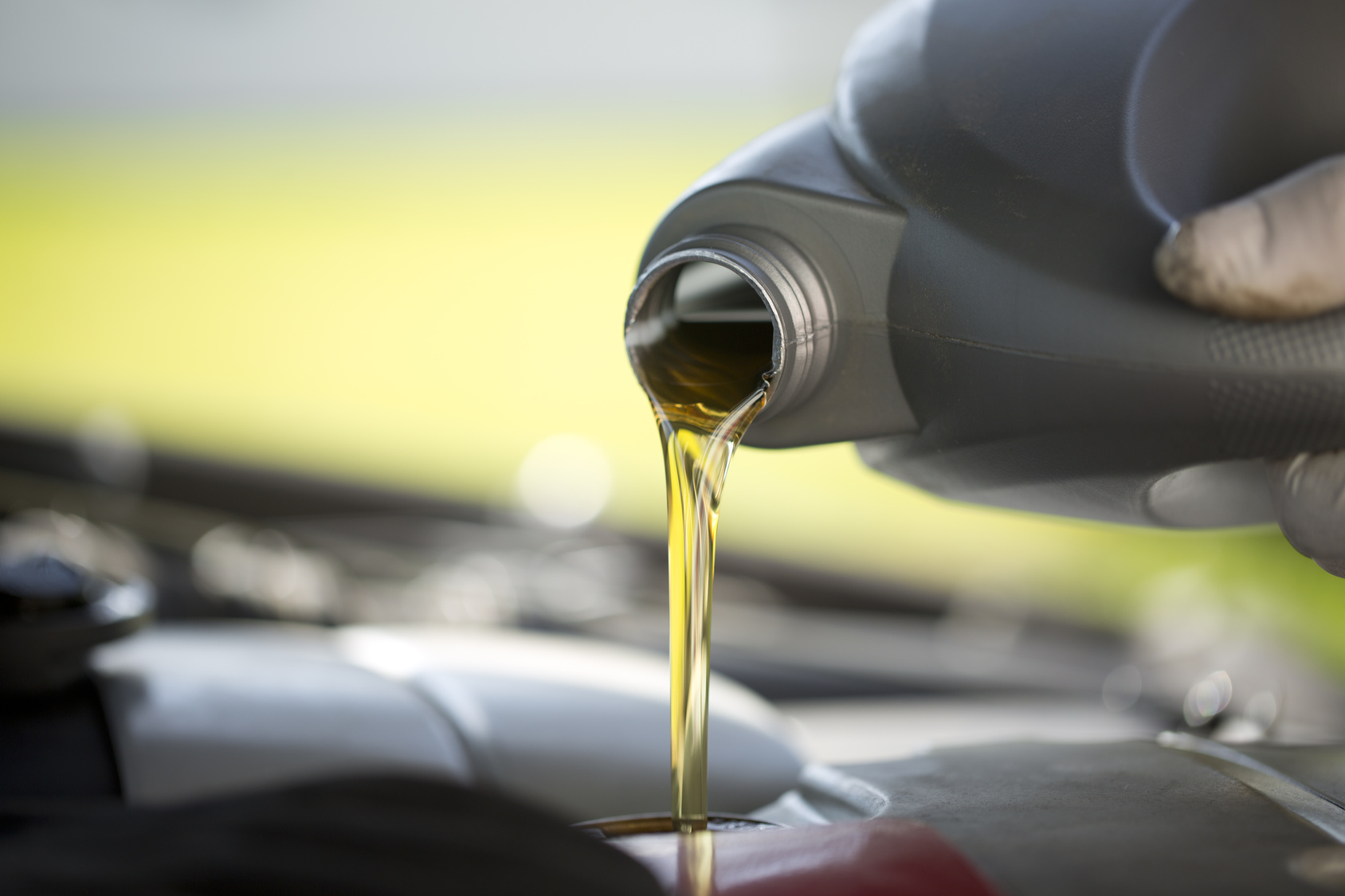
Pouring fresh motor oil into an engine

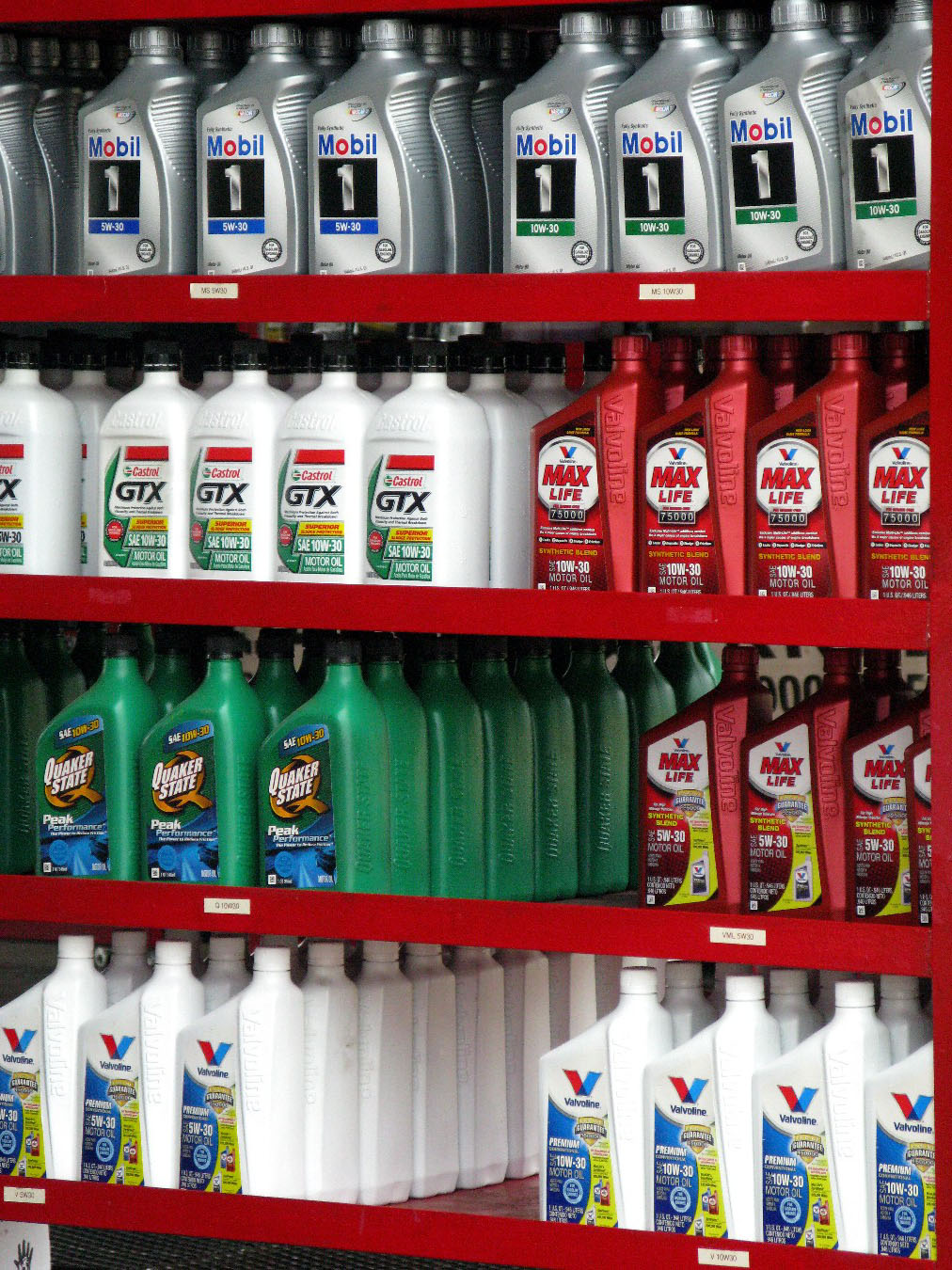
Quart containers of branded bottled motor oil at a store

Motor oil, engine oil, or engine lubricant is any one of various substances used for the lubrication of internal combustion engines. Motor oils typically consist of base oils enhanced with various additives, particularly antiwear additives, detergents, dispersants, and, for multi-grade oils, viscosity index improvers. The main function of motor oil is to reduce friction and wear on moving parts and to clean the engine from sludge (one of the functions of dispersants) and varnish (detergents). It also neutralizes acids that originate from fuel and from oxidation of the lubricant (detergents), improves the sealing of piston rings, and cools the engine by carrying heat away from moving parts.

In addition to the aforementioned basic constituents, almost all lubricating oils contain corrosion and oxidation inhibitors. Motor oil may be composed of only a lubricant base stock in the case of non-detergent oil, or a lubricant base stock plus additives to improve the oil's detergency, extreme pressure performance, and ability to inhibit corrosion of engine parts.

Motor oils are blended using base oils composed of petroleum-based hydrocarbons, polyalphaolefins (PAOs), or their mixtures in various proportions, sometimes with up to 20% by weight of esters for better dissolution of additives.

== History ==
On 6 September 1866, American John Ellis founded the Continuous Oil Refining Company. While studying the possible healing powers of crude oil, Dr. Ellis was disappointed to find no real medicinal value, but was intrigued by its potential lubricating properties. He eventually abandoned the medical practice to devote his time to the development of an all-petroleum, high-viscosity lubricant for steam engines – which at the time were using inefficient combinations of petroleum and animal- and vegetable fats. He made his breakthrough when he developed an oil that worked effectively at high temperatures. This meant fewer stuck valves and corroded cylinders.

== Use ==
Motor oil is a lubricant used in internal combustion engines, which power cars, motorcycles, lawnmowers, engine-generators, and many other machines. In engines, there are parts which move against each other, and the friction between the parts wastes otherwise useful power by converting kinetic energy into heat. It also wears away those parts, which could lead to lower efficiency and degradation of the engine. Proper lubrication decreases fuel consumption, decreases wasted power, and increases engine longevity.

Lubricating oil creates a separating film between surfaces of adjacent moving parts to minimize direct contact between them, decreasing frictional heat and reducing wear, thus protecting the engine. In use, motor oil transfers heat through conduction as it flows through the engine. In an engine with a recirculating oil pump, this heat is transferred by means of airflow over the exterior surface of the oil pan, airflow through an oil cooler, and through oil gases evacuated by the positive crankcase ventilation (PCV) system. While modern recirculating pumps are typically provided in passenger cars and other engines of similar or larger in size, total-loss oiling is a design option that remains popular in small and miniature engines.

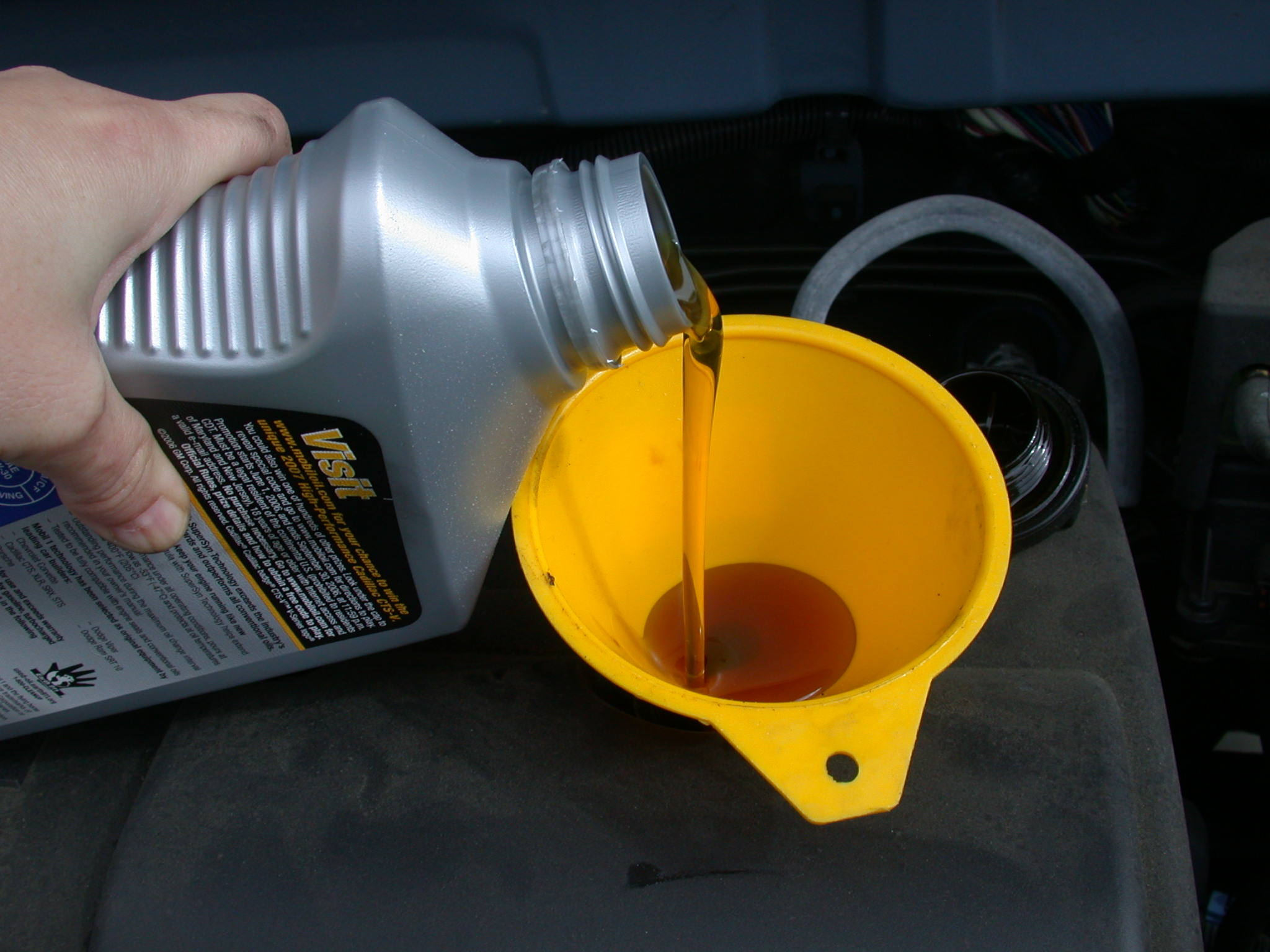
Using a funnel to assist with a motor oil refill

In petrol (gasoline) engines, the top piston ring can expose the motor oil to temperatures of 160 °C (320 °F). In diesel engines, the top ring can expose the oil to temperatures over 315 °C (600 °F). Motor oils with higher viscosity indices thin less at these higher temperatures. Diesel engines operate under high pressure and extreme heat, making them particularly reliant on proper lubrication.

Coating metal parts with oil also keeps them from being exposed to oxygen, inhibiting oxidation at elevated operating temperatures preventing rust or corrosion. Corrosion inhibitors may also be added to the motor oil. Many motor oils also have detergents and dispersants added to help keep the engine clean and minimize oil sludge build-up. The oil is able to trap soot from combustion in itself, rather than leaving it deposited on the internal surfaces. It is a combination of this and some singeing that turns used oil black after some running.

Rubbing of metal engine parts inevitably produces some microscopic metallic particles from the wearing of the surfaces. Such particles could circulate in the oil and grind against moving parts, causing wear. Because particles accumulate in the oil, it is typically circulated through an oil filter to remove harmful particles. An oil pump, a vane or gear pump powered by the engine, pumps the oil throughout the engine, including the oil filter. Oil filters can be a full flow or bypass type.

In the crankcase of a vehicle engine, motor oil lubricates rotating or sliding surfaces between the crankshaft journal bearings (main bearings and big-end bearings) and rods connecting the pistons to the crankshaft. The oil collects in an oil pan, or sump, at the bottom of the crankcase. In some small engines, such as lawn mower engines, dippers on the bottoms of connecting rods dip into the oil at the bottom and splash it around the crankcase as needed to lubricate parts inside. In modern vehicle engines, the oil pump takes oil from the oil pan and sends it through the oil filter into oil galleries, from which the oil lubricates the main bearings holding the crankshaft up at the main journals and camshaft bearings operating the valves. In typical modern vehicles, oil pressure-fed from the oil galleries to the main bearings enters holes in the main journals of the crankshaft.

From these holes in the main journals, the oil moves through passageways inside the crankshaft to exit holes in the rod journals to lubricate the rod bearings and connecting rods. Some simpler designs relied on these rapidly moving parts to splash and lubricate the contacting surfaces between the piston rings and interior surfaces of the cylinders. However, in modern designs, there are also passageways through the rods which carry oil from the rod bearings to the rod-piston connections and lubricate the contacting surfaces between the piston rings and interior surfaces of the cylinders. This oil film also serves as a seal between the piston rings and cylinder walls to separate the combustion chamber in the cylinder head from the crankcase. The oil then drips back down into the oil pan.

Motor oil may also serve as a cooling agent. In some engines, oil is sprayed through a nozzle inside the crankcase onto the piston to provide cooling of specific parts that undergo high-temperature strain. On the other hand, the thermal capacity of the oil pool has to be filled, i.e. the oil has to reach its designed temperature range before it can protect the engine under high load. This typically takes longer than heating the main cooling agent – water or mixtures thereof – up to its operating temperature. In order to inform the driver about the oil temperature, some older and most high-performance or racing engines feature an oil thermometer.

Continued operation of an internal combustion engine without adequate engine oil can cause damage to the engine, first by wear and tear, and in extreme cases by "engine seizure" where the lack of lubrication and cooling causes the engine to cease operation suddenly. Engine seizure can cause extensive damage to the engine mechanisms.

== Non-vehicle motor oils ==
The traditional two-stroke engine design is used in most small gasoline-powered consumer equipment, such as snow blowers, leaf blowers, chainsaws, model airplanes, hedge trimmers, soil cultivators, and so on. It is also used in some trolling motors for personal watercraft. In this design, motor oil is blended into the fuel to lubricate the cylinder and reciprocating assembly, in ratios such as 25:1, 40:1, or 50:1 fuel-to-oil. This two-stroke oil is burned during combustion and contributes to emissions and inefficiency. Non-smoking two-stroke oils, often composed of esters or polyglycols, are designed to reduce visible emissions and environmental impact. Environmental legislation, particularly in Europe, has driven the adoption of ester-based two-stroke oils, especially for leisure marine applications. Often, these motors are not exposed to as wide of service temperature ranges as in vehicles, so these oils may be single viscosity oils. Newer two-stroke engines used in outboard motors and some personal watercraft use direct-injection systems which eliminate the need for oil to be blended into the fuel, offering cleaner and more efficient operation at the expense of separate oil maintenance procedures. Portable electricity generators and "walk behind" lawn mowers use four-stroke engines similar to those in automotive vehicles and use standard motor oils.

== Properties ==
Most motor oils are made from a heavier, thicker petroleum hydrocarbon base stock derived from crude oil, with additives to improve certain properties. The bulk of a typical motor oil consists of hydrocarbons with between 18 and 34 carbon atoms per molecule. One of the most important properties of motor oil in maintaining a lubricating film between moving parts is its viscosity. The viscosity of a liquid can be thought of as its "thickness" or a measure of its resistance to flow. The viscosity must be high enough to maintain a lubricating film, but low enough that the oil can flow around the engine parts under all conditions. The viscosity index is a measure of how much the oil's viscosity changes as temperature changes. A higher viscosity index indicates the viscosity changes less with temperature than a lower viscosity index.

Motor oil must be able to flow adequately at the lowest temperature it is expected to experience in order to minimize metal to metal contact between moving parts upon starting up the engine. The pour point defined first this property of motor oil, as defined by ASTM D97 as "...an index of the lowest temperature of its utility..." for a given application, but the cold-cranking simulator (CCS, see ASTM D5293-08) and mini-rotary viscometer (MRV, see ASTM D3829-02(2007), ASTM D4684-08) are today the properties required in motor oil specs and define the Society of Automotive Engineers (SAE) classifications.

Oil is largely composed of hydrocarbons which can burn if ignited. Still another important property of motor oil is its flash point, the lowest temperature at which the oil gives off vapors which can ignite. It is dangerous for the oil in a motor to ignite and burn, so a high flash point is desirable. At a petroleum refinery, fractional distillation separates a motor oil fraction from other crude oil fractions, removing the more volatile components, and therefore increasing the oil's flash point (reducing its tendency to burn).

Another manipulated property of motor oil is its total base number (TBN), which is a measurement of the reserve alkalinity of an oil, meaning its ability to neutralize acids. The resulting quantity is determined as mg KOH/ (gram of lubricant). Analogously, total acid number (TAN) is the measure of a lubricant's acidity. Other tests include zinc, phosphorus, or sulfur content, and testing for excessive foaming.

The Noack volatility test (ASTM D-5800) determines the physical evaporation loss of lubricants in high temperature service. A maximum of 14% evaporation loss is allowable to meet API SL and ILSAC GF-3 specifications. Some automotive OEM oil specifications require lower than 10%.

Table of thermal and physical properties of typical (SAE 20W) unused engine oil:

Temperature (°C)	Density (kg/m^{3})	Specific heat (kJ/kg⋅K)	Kinematic viscosity (m^{2}/s)	Conductivity (W/m⋅K)	Thermal diffusivity (m^{2}/s)	Prandtl Number	Bulk modulus (K^{-1})
0	899.12	1.796	4.28E-03	0.147	9.11E-08	47100	7.00E-04
20	888.23	1.88	9.00E-04	0.145	8.72E-08	10400	7.00E-04
40	876.05	1.964	2.40E-04	0.144	8.34E-08	2870	7.00E-04
60	864.04	2.047	8.39E-05	0.14	8.00E-08	1050	7.00E-04
80	852.02	2.131	3.75E-05	0.138	7.69E-08	490	7.00E-04
100	840.01	2.219	2.03E-05	0.137	7.38E-08	276	7.00E-04
120	828.96	2.307	1.24E-05	0.135	7.10E-08	175	7.00E-04
140	816.94	2.395	8.00E-06	0.133	6.86E-08	116	7.00E-04
160	805.89	2.483	5.60E-06	0.132	6.63E-08	84	7.00E-04

== Maintenance ==
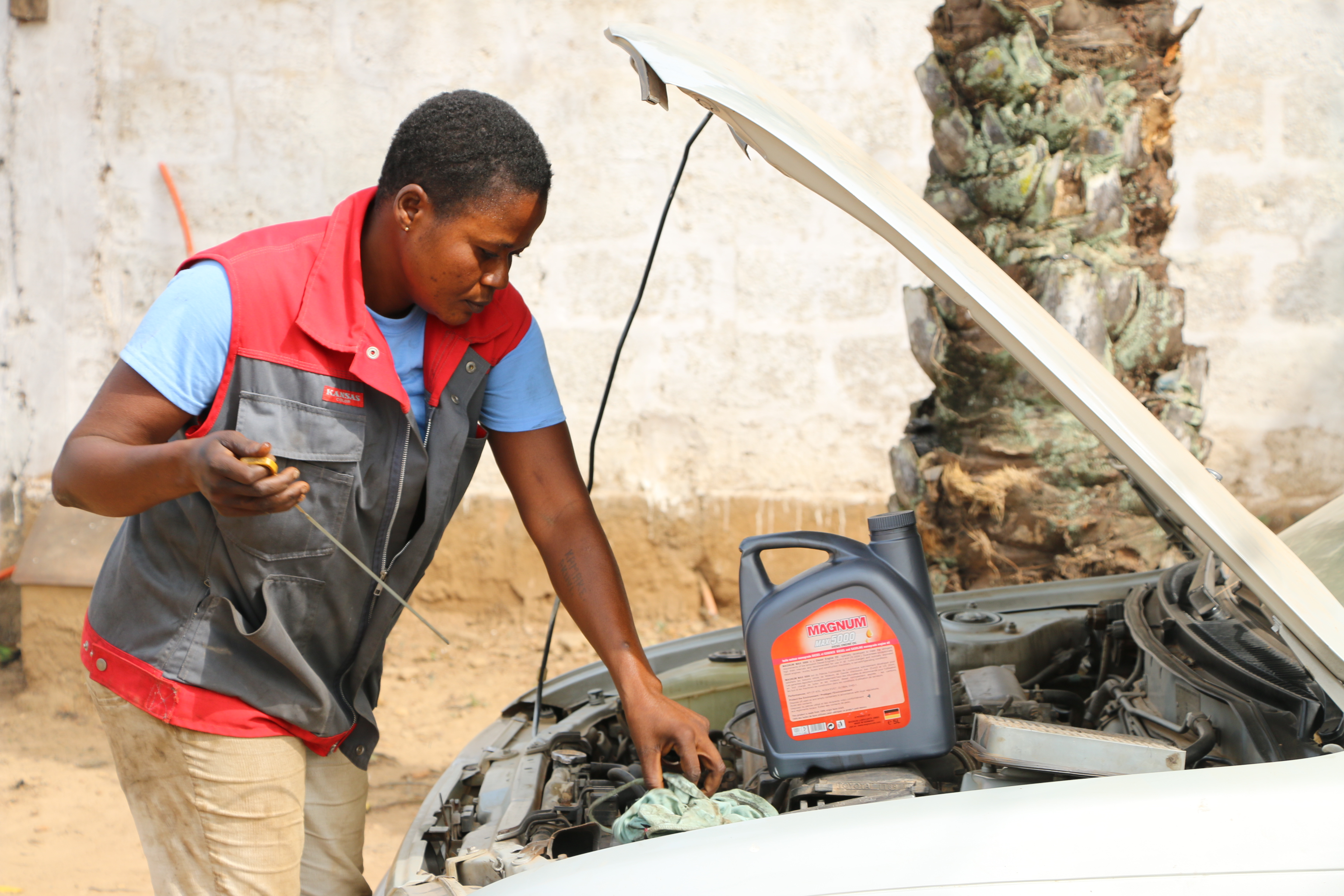
A woman checking a car's oil level in Togo, West Africa

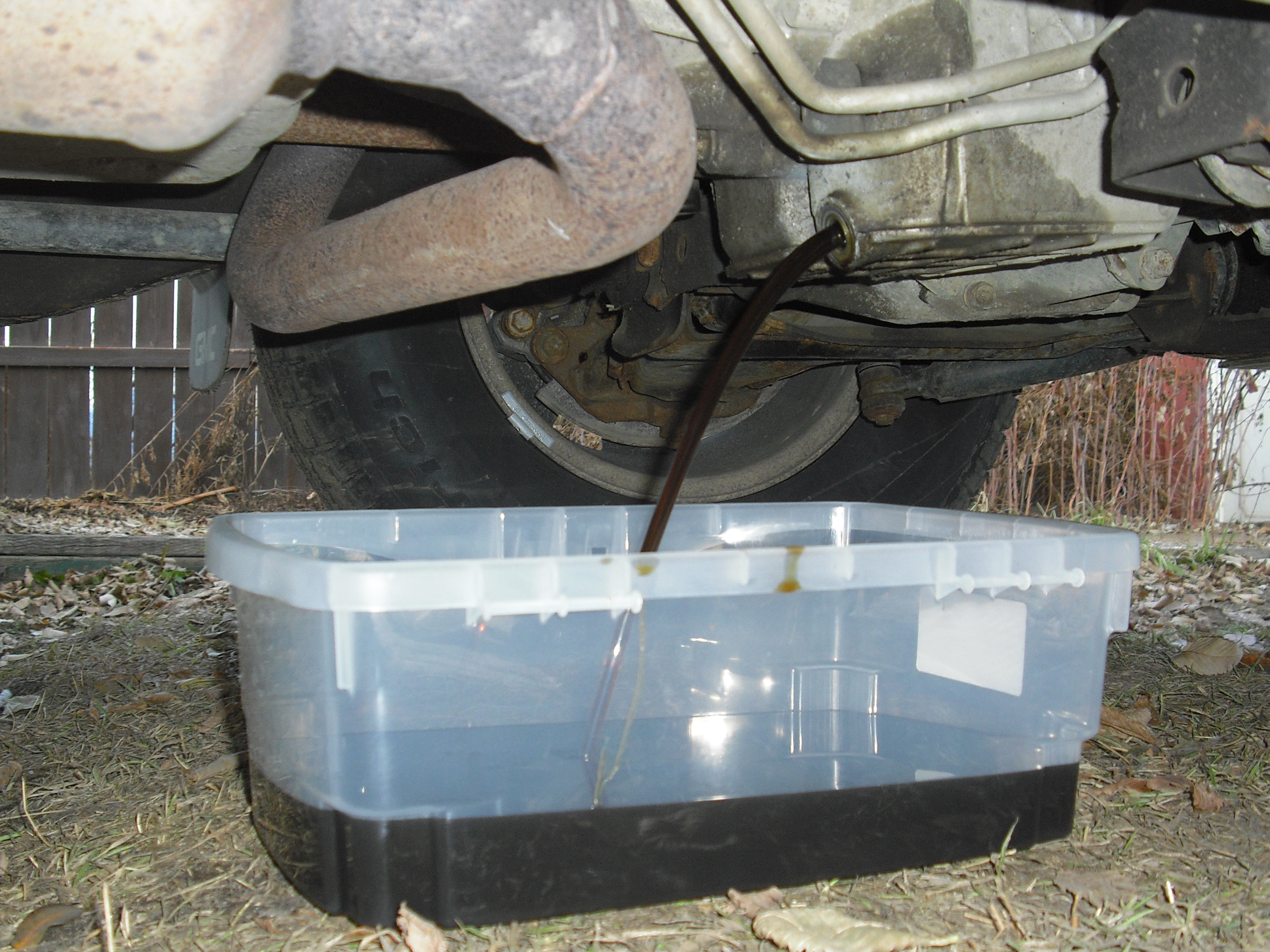
Oil being drained from a car into a drip pan

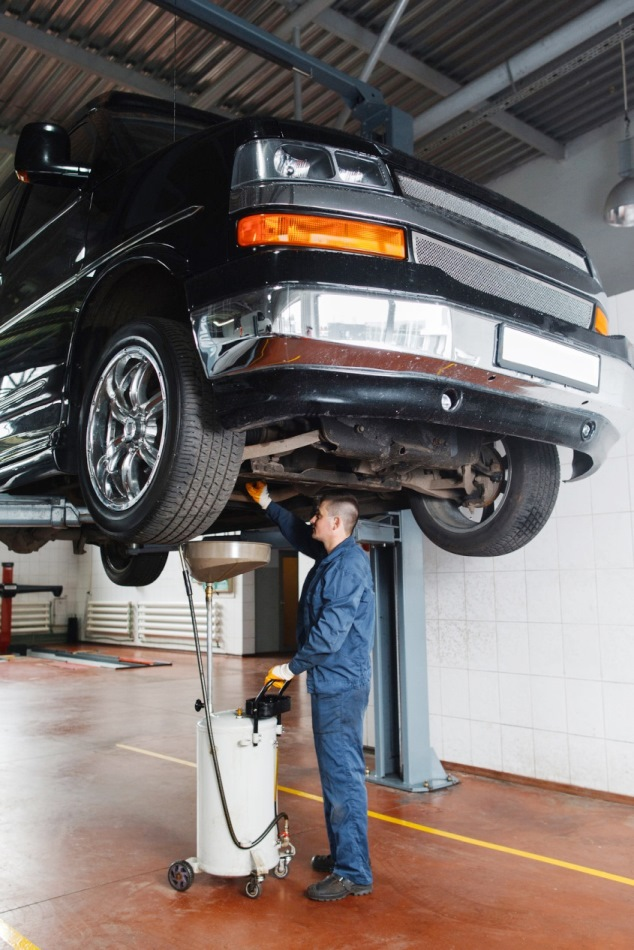
A van's oil being drained at an oil-change shop

The oil and the oil filter need to be periodically replaced; the process is called an oil change. While there is an entire industry surrounding regular oil changes and maintenance, an oil change is a relatively simple car maintenance operation that many car owners can do themselves. It involves draining the oil from the engine into a drip pan, replacing the filter, and adding fresh oil. However, most localities require the used oil to be recycled after an oil change.

In engines, there is some exposure of the oil to products of internal combustion, and microscopic coke particles from black soot accumulate in the oil during operation. Also, the rubbing of metal engine parts produces some microscopic metallic particles from the wearing of the surfaces. Such particles could circulate in the oil and grind against the part surfaces causing wear. The oil filter removes many of the particles and sludge, but eventually, the oil filter can become clogged, if used for extremely long periods.

The motor oil and especially the additives also undergo thermal and mechanical degradation, which reduces the viscosity and reserve alkalinity of the oil. At reduced viscosity, the oil is not as capable of lubricating the engine, thus increasing wear and the chance of overheating. Reserve alkalinity is the ability of the oil to resist the formation of acids. Should the reserve alkalinity decline to zero, those acids form and corrode the engine.

Some engine manufacturers specify which Society of Automotive Engineers (SAE) viscosity grade of oil should be used, but different viscosity motor oil may perform better based on the operating environment. Many manufacturers have varying requirements and have designations for motor oil they require to be used. This is driven by the EPA requirement that the same viscosity grade of oil used in the MPG test must be recommended to the customer. This exclusive recommendation led to the elimination of informative charts depicting climate temperature range along with several corresponding oil viscosity grades being suggested.

In general, unless specified by the manufacturer, thicker oils are not necessarily better than thinner oils; heavy oils tend to stick longer to parts between two moving surfaces, and this degrades the oil faster than a lighter oil that flows better, allowing fresh oil in its place sooner. Cold weather has a thickening effect on conventional oil, and this is one reason thinner oils are manufacturer recommended in places with cold winters.

Motor oil changes are usually scheduled based on the time in service or the distance that the vehicle has traveled. These are rough indications of the real factors that control when an oil change is appropriate, which include how long the oil has been run at elevated temperatures, how many heating cycles the engine has been through, and how hard the engine has worked. The vehicle distance is intended to estimate the time at high temperature, while the time in service is supposed to correlate with the number of vehicle trips and capture the number of heating cycles. Oil does not degrade significantly just sitting in a cold engine. On the other hand, if a car is driven just for very short distances, the oil will not fully heat up, and it will accumulate contaminants such as water, due to lack of sufficient heat to boil off the water. Oil in this condition, just sitting in an engine, can cause problems.

Also important is the quality of the oil used, especially with synthetics (synthetics are more stable than conventional oils). Some manufacturers address this (for example, BMW and VW with their respective long-life standards), while others do not.

Time-based intervals account for the short-trip drivers who drive short distances, which build up more contaminants. Manufacturers advise to not exceed their time or distance-driven interval for a motor oil change. Many modern cars now list somewhat higher intervals for changing oil and filter, with the constraint of "severe" service requiring more frequent changes with less-than-ideal driving. This applies to short trips of under 15 kilometres (10 mi), where the oil does not get to full operating temperature long enough to boil off condensation, excess fuel, and other contamination that leads to "sludge", "varnish", "acids", or other deposits. Many manufacturers have engine computer calculations to estimate the oil's condition based on the factors which degrade it, such as RPM, temperature, and trip length; one system adds an optical sensor for determining the clarity of the oil in the engine. These systems are commonly known as oil life monitors or OLMs.

Some quick oil change shops recommend intervals of 5,000 kilometres (3,000 mi), or every three months; this is not necessary, according to many automobile manufacturers. This has led to a campaign by the California EPA against the "3,000-mile myth", promoting vehicle manufacturer's recommendations for oil change intervals over those of the oil change industry.

The engine user can, in replacing the oil, adjust the viscosity for the ambient temperature change, thicker for summer heat and thinner for the winter cold. Lower-viscosity oils are common in newer vehicles.

By the mid-1980s, recommended viscosities had moved down to 5W-30, primarily to improve fuel efficiency. A typical modern application would be Honda motor's use of 5W-20 (and in their newest vehicles, 0W-20) viscosity oil for 12,000 kilometres (7,500 mi). Engine designs are evolving to allow the use of even lower-viscosity oils without the risk of excessive metal-to-metal abrasion, principally in the cam and valve mechanism areas. In line with car manufacturers push towards these lower viscosities in search of better fuel economy, in April 2013 the Society of Automotive Engineers (SAE) introduced an SAE 16 viscosity rating, a break from its traditional "divisible by 10" numbering system for its high-temperature viscosity ratings that spanned from low-viscosity SAE 20 to high-viscosity SAE 60.

== Standards ==
=== SAE J300 viscosity grades ===
The Society of Automotive Engineers (SAE) has established a numerical code system for grading motor oils according to their viscosity characteristics known as SAE J300. This standard is commonly used throughout the world, and standards organizations that do so include API and ACEA. The grades include single grades, such as SAE 30, and also multi-grades such as SAE 15W-30. A multi-grade consists of a winter grade specifying the viscosity at cold temperatures and a non-winter grade specifying the viscosity at operating temperatures. An engine oil using a polymeric viscosity index improver (VII) must be classified as multi-grade.

Breakdown of VIIs under shear is a concern in motorcycle applications, where the transmission may share lubricating oil with the motor. For this reason, motorcycle-specific oil is sometimes recommended. The necessity of higher-priced motorcycle-specific oil has also been challenged by at least one consumer organization.

=== American Petroleum Institute ===
Engine lubricants are evaluated against the American Petroleum Institute (API), SJ, SL, SM, SN, SP, CH-4, CI-4, CI-4 PLUS, CJ-4, CK, and FA, as well as International Lubricant Standardization and Approval Committee (ILSAC) GF-3, GF-4, GF-5, GF-6A, GF-6B and Cummins, Mack and John Deere (and other Original Equipment Manufacturers (OEM)) requirements. These evaluations include chemical and physical properties using bench test methods as well as actual running engine tests to quantify engine sludge, oxidation, component wear, oil consumption, piston deposits and fuel economy. Originally S for spark ignition and C for compression, as used with diesel engines. Many oil producers still refer these categories in their marketing.

The API sets minimum performance standards for lubricants. Motor oil is used for the lubrication, cooling, and cleaning of internal combustion engines. Motor oil may be composed of only a lubricant base stock in the case of mostly obsolete non-detergent oil, or a lubricant base stock plus additives to improve the oil's detergency, extreme pressure performance, and ability to inhibit corrosion of engine parts.

Groups: Lubricant base stocks are categorized into five groups by the API. Group I base stocks are composed of fractionally distilled petroleum which is further refined with solvent extraction processes to improve certain properties such as oxidation resistance and to remove wax. Poorly refined mineral oils that fail to meet the minimum VI of 80 required in group I fit into Group V. Group II base stocks are composed of fractionally distilled petroleum that has been hydrocracked to further refine and purify it. Group III base stocks have similar characteristics to Group II base stocks, except that Group III base stocks have higher viscosity indexes. Group III base stocks are produced by further hydrocracking of either Group II base stocks or hydroisomerized slack wax (a Group I and II dewaxing process by-product). Group IV base stock are polyalphaolefins (PAOs). Group V is a catch-all group for any base stock not described by Groups I to IV. Examples of group V base stocks include polyolesters (POE), polyalkylene glycols (PAG), and perfluoropolyalkylethers (PFPAEs) and poorly refined mineral oil. Groups I and II are commonly referred to as mineral oils, group III is typically referred to as synthetic (except in Germany and Japan, where they must not be called synthetic) and group IV is a synthetic oil. Group V base oils are so diverse that there is no catch-all description.

The API service classes have two general classifications: S for "service/spark ignition" (typical passenger cars and light trucks using gasoline engines), and C for "commercial/compression ignition" (typical diesel equipment). Engine oil which has been tested and meets the API standards may display the API Service Symbol (also known as the "Donut") with the service categories on containers sold to oil users.

The latest API service category is API SP for gasoline automobile and light-truck engines. The SP standard refers to a group of laboratory and engine tests, including the latest series for control of high-temperature deposits. Current API service categories include SP, SN, SM, SL and SJ for gasoline engines. All earlier service categories are obsolete. Motorcycle oils commonly still use the SF/SG standard though.

All the current gasoline categories (including the obsolete SH) have placed limitations on the phosphorus content for certain SAE viscosity grades (the xW-20, xW-30) due to the chemical poisoning that phosphorus has on catalytic converters. Phosphorus is a key anti-wear component in motor oil and is usually found in motor oil in the form of zinc dithiophosphate (ZDDP). Each new API category has placed successively lower phosphorus and zinc limits, and thus has created a controversial issue of obsolescent oils needed for older engines, especially engines with sliding (flat/cleave) tappets. API and ILSAC, which represents most of the world's major automobile/engine manufacturers, state API SM/ILSAC GF-4 is fully backwards compatible, and it is noted that one of the engine tests required for API SM, the Sequence IVA, is a sliding tappet design to test specifically for cam wear protection. Not everyone is in agreement with backwards compatibility, and in addition, there are special situations, such as "performance" engines or fully race built engines, where the engine protection requirements are above and beyond API/ILSAC requirements. Because of this, there are specialty oils out in the market place with higher than API allowed phosphorus levels. Most engines built before 1985 have the flat/cleave bearing style systems of construction, which is sensitive to reducing zinc and phosphorus. For example, in API SG rated oils, this was at the 1200–1300 ppm level for zinc and phosphorus, where the current SM is under 600 ppm. This reduction in anti-wear chemicals in oil has caused premature failures of camshafts and other high pressure bearings in many older automobiles and has been blamed for premature failure of the oil pump drive/cam position sensor gear that is meshed with camshaft gear in some modern engines.

The current diesel engine service categories are API CK-4, CJ-4, CI-4 PLUS, CI-4, CH-4, and FA-4. The previous service categories such as API CC or CD are obsolete. API solved problems with API CI-4 by creating a separate API CI-4 PLUS category that contains some additional requirements – this marking is located in the lower portion of the API Service Symbol "Donut".

API CK-4 and FA-4 have been introduced for 2017 model American engines. API CK-4 is backward compatible that means API CK-4 oils are assumed to provide superior performance to oils made to previous categories and could be used without problems in all previous model engines.

API FA-4 oils are formulated for enhanced fuel economy (presented as reduced greenhouse gas emission). To achieve that, they are SAE xW-30 oils blended to a high temperature high shear viscosity from 2.9 cP to 3.2 cP. They are not suitable for all engines thus their use depends on the decision of each engine manufacturer. They cannot be used with diesel fuel containing more than 15 ppm sulfur.

Cummins reacted to the introduction of API CK-4 and API FA-4 by issuing its CES 20086 list of API CK-4 registered oils and CES 20087 list of API FA-4 registered oils. Valvoline oils are preferred.

While engine oils are formulated to meet a specific API service category, they in fact conform closely enough to both the gasoline and diesel categories. Thus diesel rated engine oils usually carry the relevant gasoline categories, e.g. an API CJ-4 oil could show either API SL or API SM on the container. The rule is that the first mentioned category is fully met and the second one is fully met except where its requirements clash with the requirements of the first one.

==== Motorcycle oil ====
The API oil classification structure has eliminated specific support for wet-clutch motorcycle applications in their descriptors, and API SJ and newer oils are referred to be specific to automobile and light truck use. Accordingly, motorcycle oils are subject to their own unique standards. See JASO below. As discussed above, motorcycle oils commonly still use the obsolescent SF/SG standard.

=== ILSAC ===
The International Lubricant Standardization and Approval Committee (ILSAC) also has standards for motor oil. Introduced in 2004, GF-4 applies to SAE 0W-20, 5W-20, 0W-30, 5W-30, and 10W-30 viscosity grade oils. In general, ILSAC works with API in creating the newest gasoline oil specification, with ILSAC adding an extra requirement of fuel economy testing to their specification. For GF-4, a Sequence VIB Fuel Economy Test (ASTM D6837) is required that is not required in API service category SM.

A key new test for GF-4, which is also required for API SM, is the Sequence IIIG, which involves running a 3.8 litres (230 cu in), GM 3.8 L V-6 at 125 hp (93 kW), 3,600 rpm, and 150 °C (302 °F) oil temperature for 100 hours. These are much more severe conditions than any API-specified oil was designed for: cars which typically push their oil temperature consistently above 100 °C (212 °F) are most turbocharged engines, along with most engines of European or Japanese origin, particularly small capacity, high power output.

The IIIG test is about 50% more difficult than the previous IIIF test, used in GF-3 and API SL oils. Engine oils bearing the API starburst symbol since 2005 are ILSAC GF-4 compliant. To help consumers recognize that an oil meets the ILSAC requirements, API developed a "starburst" certification mark.

A new set of specifications, GF-5, took effect in October 2010. The industry had one year to convert their oils to GF-5 and in September 2011, ILSAC no longer offered licensing for GF-4.

After nearly a decade of GF-5, ILSAC released final GF-6 specifications in 2019, with licensed sales to oil manufacturers and re-branders to begin in May 2020. There are two GF6 standards; GF-6A being a progression and fully backwards compatible with GF-5, and GF-6B specifically for SAE 0W-16 viscosity oil.

=== ACEA ===
The ACEA (Association des Constructeurs Européens d'Automobiles) performance/quality classifications A3/A5 tests used in Europe are arguably more stringent than the API and ILSAC standards. CEC (The Co-ordinating European Council) is the development body for fuel and lubricant testing in Europe and beyond, setting the standards via their European Industry groups; ACEA, ATIEL, ATC and CONCAWE.

ACEA does not certify oils, nor license, nor register, compliance certificates. Oil manufacturers are themselves responsible for carrying out all oil testing and evaluation according to recognised engine lubricant industry standards and practices.

Popular categories include A3/B3 and A3/B4 which are defined as "Stable, stay-in-grade Engine Oil intended for use in Passenger Car & Light Duty Van Gasoline & Diesel Engines with extended drain intervals" A3/B5 is suitable only for engines designed to use low viscosities. Category C oils are designated for use with catalysts and particulate filters while Category E is for heavy duty diesel.

=== JASO ===
The Japanese Automotive Standards Organization (JASO) has created their own set of performance and quality standards for petrol engines of Japanese origin.

For four-stroke gasoline engines, the JASO T904 standard is used, and is particularly relevant to motorcycle engines. The JASO T904-MA and MA2 standards are designed to distinguish oils that are approved for wet clutch use, with MA2 lubricants delivering higher friction performance. The JASO T904-MB standard denotes oils not suitable for wet clutch use, and are therefore used in scooters equipped with continuously variable transmissions. The addition of friction modifiers to JASO MB oils can contribute to greater fuel economy in these applications.

For two-stroke gasoline engines, the JASO M345 (FA, FB, FC, FD) standard is used, and this refers particularly to low ash, lubricity, detergency, low smoke and exhaust blocking.

These standards, especially JASO-MA (for motorcycles) and JASO-FC, are designed to address oil-requirement issues not addressed by the API service categories. One element of the JASO-MA standard is a friction test designed to determine suitability for wet clutch usage. An oil that meets JASO-MA is considered appropriate for wet clutch operations. Oils marketed as motorcycle-specific will carry the JASO-MA label.

=== ASTM ===
A 1989 American Society for Testing and Materials (ASTM) report stated that its 12-year effort to come up with a new high-temperature, high-shear (HTHS) standard was not successful. Referring to SAE J300, the basis for current grading standards, the report stated:

The rapid growth of non-Newtonian multigraded oils has rendered kinematic viscosity as a nearly useless parameter for characterising "real" viscosity in critical zones of an engine... There are those who are disappointed that the twelve-year effort has not resulted in a redefinition of the SAE J300 Engine Oil Viscosity Classification document so as to express high-temperature viscosity of the various grades ... In the view of this writer, this redefinition did not occur because the automotive lubricant market knows of no field failures unambiguously attributable to insufficient HTHS oil viscosity.

=== Manufacturer specifications ===
Some current engine or vehicle manufacturers require a specific oil formula, known as oil specs, be used to add extra levels of protection for special engine designs, materials and operating conditions.

==== GM ====
General Motors defined and licensed Dexos oil specifications from 2011. Dexos 1 and Dexos R are designed for petrol (gasoline) engines, Dexos 2 and Dexos D are designed for diesel engines, however Dexos 2 is specified for European petrol vehicles too.

Dexos1 was introduced in 2011, superseded by Dexos1Gen2 in 2015, and later Dexos1Gen3. Dexos 2 was discontinued in 2025, replaced by Dexos D for diesels, and Dexos R for petrol (gasoline) engines.

==== BMW ====
Starting in the late 1990s, BMW for example came out with a spec called LL-98 (Long Life 1998) which requires special additives in oils that were approved to meet that spec. BMW regularly develops new specs to meet the increasing demands of the EPA emission standards and MPG requirements as well as new engines. Failure to use the correct specification oil has been known to cause PCV (positive crankcase ventilation), VVT (variable valve timing) system, gasket and sealing system, and other internal combustion component premature clogging and other failures. Some of the additives in those specs are designed to aid in keeping systems lubricated and clean. Some examples of BMW's other specs are: LL-01, LL-01 fe, LL-12, LL-14+, LL-17 fe. European vehicle manufacturers have led the way for oil specs but Asian and American manufacturers have since joined in creating a need for oil change, repair shops and dealerships to carry many different oils to avoid damages both mechanical and monetarily.

== Other additives ==
In addition to the viscosity index improvers, motor oil manufacturers often include other additives such as detergents and dispersants to help keep the engine clean by minimizing sludge buildup, corrosion inhibitors, and alkaline additives to neutralize acidic oxidation products of the oil. Most commercial oils have a minimal amount of zinc dialkyldithiophosphate as an anti-wear additive to protect contacting metal surfaces with zinc and other compounds in case of metal to metal contact. The quantity of zinc dialkyldithiophosphate is limited to minimize adverse effect on catalytic converters. Another aspect for after-treatment devices is the deposition of oil ash, which increases the exhaust back pressure and reduces fuel economy over time. The so-called "chemical box" limits today the concentrations of sulfur, ash and phosphorus (SAP).

There are other additives available commercially which can be added to the oil by the user for purported additional benefit. Some of these additives include:

- Antiwear additives, like zinc dialkyldithiophosphate (ZDDP) and its alternatives due to phosphorus limits in some specifications. Calcium sulfonates additives are also added to protect motor oil from oxidative breakdown and to prevent the formation of sludge and varnish deposits. Both were the main basis of additive packages used by lubricant manufacturers up until the 1990s when the need for ashless additives arose. Main advantage was very low price and wide availability (sulfonates were originally waste byproducts). Currently there are ashless oil lubricants without these additives, which can only fulfill the qualities of the previous generation with more expensive basestock and more expensive organic or organometallic additive compounds. Some new oils are not formulated to provide the level of protection of previous generations to save manufacturing costs.
- Some molybdenum disulfide containing additives to lubricating oils are claimed to reduce friction, bond to metal, or have anti-wear properties. MoS_{2} particles can be shear-welded on steel surface and some engine components were even treated with MoS_{2} layer during manufacture, namely liners in engines. (Trabant for example). They were used in World War II in flight engines and became commercial after World War II until the 1990s. They were commercialized in the 1970s (ELF ANTAR Molygraphite) and are today still available (Liqui Moly MoS_{2} 10 W-40). A disadvantage of molybdenum disulfide is its anthracite black color, so oil treated with it is hard to distinguish from soot-filled engine oil.
- In the 1980s and 1990s, additives with suspended PTFE particles were available, e.g., "Slick50", to consumers to increase motor oil's ability to coat and protect metal surfaces. There is controversy as to the actual effectiveness of these products, as they can coagulate and clog the oil filter and tiny oil passages in the engine. It is supposed to work under boundary lubricating conditions, which good engine designs tend to avoid anyway. Also, Teflon alone has little to no ability to firmly stick on a sheared surface, unlike molybdenum disulfide, for example.
- Many patents proposed use perfluoropolymers, such as PTFE (Teflon), or micronized PTFE, to reduce friction between metal parts. However, the application obstacle of PTFE is insolubility in lubricant oils. Their application is questionable and depends mainly on the engine design – one that can not maintain reasonable lubricating conditions might benefit, while properly designed engine with oil film thick enough would not see any difference. PTFE is a very soft material, thus its friction coefficient becomes worse than that of hardened steel-to-steel mating surfaces under common loads. PTFE is used in composition of sliding bearings where it improves lubrication under relatively light load until the oil pressure builds up to full hydrodynamic lubricating conditions.

Some molybdenum disulfide-containing oils may be unsuitable for motorcycles which share wet clutch lubrication with the engine.

== Environmental effects ==
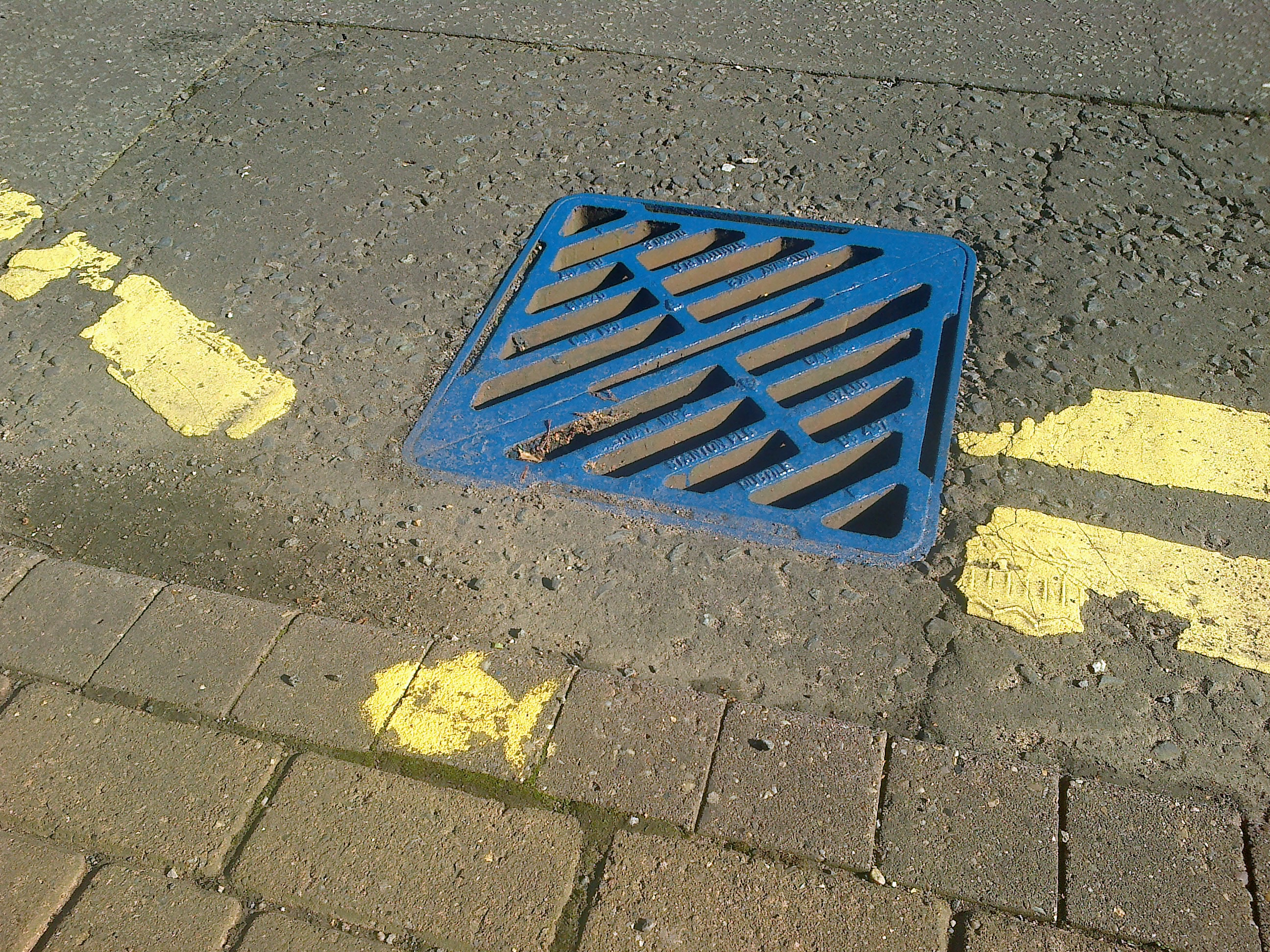
Blue drain and yellow fish symbol used by the UK Environment Agency to raise awareness of the ecological impacts of contaminating surface drainage

Due to its chemical composition, worldwide dispersion and effects on the environment, used motor oil is considered a serious environmental problem. Most current motor-oil lubricants contain petroleum base stocks, which are toxic to the environment and difficult to dispose of after use. Over 40% of the pollution in America's waterways is from used motor oil. Used oil is considered the largest source of oil pollution in the U.S. harbors and waterways, at 1,460 ML (385×10^{6} US gal) per year, mostly from improper disposal. By far the greatest cause of motor-oil pollution in oceans comes from drains and urban street-runoff, much of it caused by improper disposal of engine oil. One US gallon (3.8 L) of used oil can generate a 32,000 m^{2} (8 acres) slick on surface water, threatening fish, waterfowl and other aquatic life. According to the U.S. EPA, films of oil on the surface of water prevent the replenishment of dissolved oxygen, impair photosynthetic processes, and block sunlight. Toxic effects of used oil on freshwater and marine organisms vary, but significant long-term effects have been found at concentrations of 310 ppm in several freshwater fish species and as low as 1 ppm in marine life forms. Motor oil can have an incredibly detrimental effect on the environment, particularly to plants that depend on healthy soil to grow. There are three main ways that motor oil affects plants:

- contaminating water supplies
- contaminating soil
- poisoning plants

Used motor-oil dumped on land reduces soil productivity. Improperly disposed used oil ends up in landfills, sewers, backyards, or storm drains where soil, groundwater and drinking water may become contaminated.

== Synthetic oils ==
Synthetic lubricants were first made in significant quantities as replacements for mineral lubricants (and fuels) by German scientists in the late 1930s and early 1940s, because of their insufficient quantities of crude needed to fight in World War II. A significant factor in their gain in popularity was the ability of synthetic-based lubricants to remain fluid in very low temperatures, such as those encountered on Germany's eastern front, which caused petroleum-based lubricants to solidify owing to their higher wax content. The use of synthetic lubricants widened through the 1950s and 1960s owing to a property at the other end of the temperature spectrum – the ability to lubricate aviation engines at high temperatures that caused mineral-based lubricants to break down. In the mid-1970s, synthetic motor oils were formulated and commercially applied for the first time in automotive applications. The same SAE system for designating motor oil viscosity also applies to synthetic oils.

Synthetic oils are derived from either Group III, Group IV, or some Group V bases. Synthetics include classes of lubricants like synthetic esters (Group V) as well as "others" like GTL (methane gas-to-liquid) (Group III +) and polyalpha-olefins (Group IV). Higher purity and therefore better property control theoretically means synthetic oil has better mechanical properties at extremes of high and low temperatures. The molecules are made large and "soft" enough to retain good viscosity at higher temperatures, yet branched molecular structures interfere with solidification and therefore allow flow at lower temperatures. Thus, although the viscosity still decreases as temperature increases, these synthetic motor oils have a higher viscosity index over the traditional petroleum base. Their specially designed properties allow a wider temperature range at higher and lower temperatures and often include a lower pour point. With their improved viscosity index, synthetic oils need lower levels of viscosity index improvers, which are the oil components most vulnerable to thermal and mechanical degradation as the oil ages, and thus they do not degrade as quickly as traditional motor oils. However, they still fill up with particulate matter, although the matter better suspends within the oil, and the oil filter still fills and clogs up over time. So periodic oil and filter changes should still be done with synthetic oil, but some synthetic oil suppliers suggest that the intervals between oil changes can be longer, sometimes as long as 16,000–24,000 kilometres (9,900–14,900 mi) primarily due to reduced degradation by oxidation.

Tests show that fully synthetic oil is superior in extreme service conditions to conventional oil, and may perform better for longer under standard conditions. But in the vast majority of vehicle applications, mineral oil-based lubricants, fortified with additives and with the benefit of over a century of development, continue to be the predominant lubricant for most internal combustion engine applications.

== Bio-based oils ==
Bio-based oils existed prior to the development of petroleum-based oils in the 19th century. They have become the subject of renewed interest with the advent of bio-fuels and the push for green products. The development of canola-based motor oils began in 1996 in order to pursue environmentally friendly products. Purdue University has funded a project to develop and test such oils. Test results indicate satisfactory performance from the oils tested. A review on the status of bio-based motor oils and base oils globally, as well as in the U.S., shows how bio-based lubricants show promise in augmenting the current petroleum-based supply of lubricating materials, as well as replacing it in many cases.

The USDA National Center for Agricultural Utilization Research developed an Estolide lubricant technology made from vegetable and animal oils. Estolides have shown great promise in a wide range of applications, including engine lubricants. Working with the USDA, a California-based company Biosynthetic Technologies has developed a high-performance "drop-in" biosynthetic oil using Estolide technology for use in motor oils and industrial lubricants. This biosynthetic oil American Petroleum Institute (API) has the potential to greatly reduce environmental challenges associated with petroleum. Independent testing not only shows biosynthetic oils to be among the highest-rated products for protecting engines and machinery; they are also bio-based, biodegradable, non-toxic and do not bioaccumulate in marine organisms. Also, motor oils and lubricants formulated with biosynthetic base oils can be recycled and re-refined with petroleum-based oils. The U.S.-based company Green Earth Technologies manufactures a bio-based motor oil, called G-Oil, made from animal oils.

== Future ==
A process to break down polyethylene, a common plastic product found in many consumer containers, converts it into a paraffin-like wax with the correct molecular properties for conversion into a lubricant, avoiding the expensive Fischer–Tropsch process. The plastic is melted and then pumped into a furnace. The heat of the furnace breaks down the molecular chains of polyethylene into wax. Finally, the wax is subjected to a catalytic process that alters the wax's molecular structure, leaving a clear oil.

Biodegradable motor oils based on esters or hydrocarbon-ester blends appeared in the 1990s followed by formulations beginning in 2000 which respond to the bio-no-tox-criteria of the European preparations directive (EC/1999/45). This means, that they not only are biodegradable according to OECD 301x test methods, but also the aquatic toxicities (fish, algae, daphnia) are each above 100 mg/L.

Another class of base oils suited for engine oil are the polyalkylene glycols. They offer zero-ash, bio-no-tox properties, and lean burn characteristics.

== Re-refined motor oil ==
The oil in a motor oil product breaks down and burns as it is used in an engine – it also gets contaminated with particles and chemicals that make it a less effective lubricant. Re-refining cleans the contaminants and used additives out of the dirty oil. From there, this clean "base stock" is blended with some virgin base stock and a new additives package to make a finished lubricant product that can be just as effective as lubricants made with all-virgin oil. The United States Environmental Protection Agency (EPA) defines re-refined products as containing at least 25% re-refined base stock, but other standards are significantly higher. The California State public contract code defines a re-refined motor oil as one that contains at least 70% re-refined base stock.

== Packaging ==
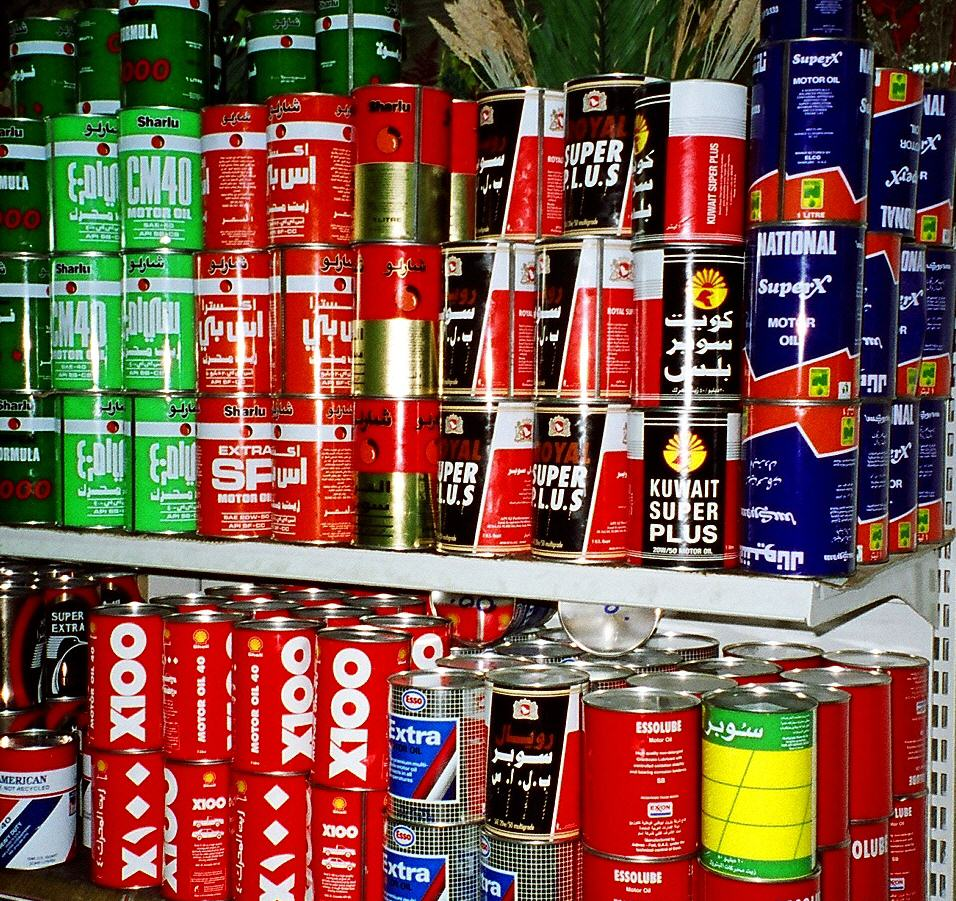
Range of motor oils on display in Kuwait in obsolete cardboard cans with steel lids

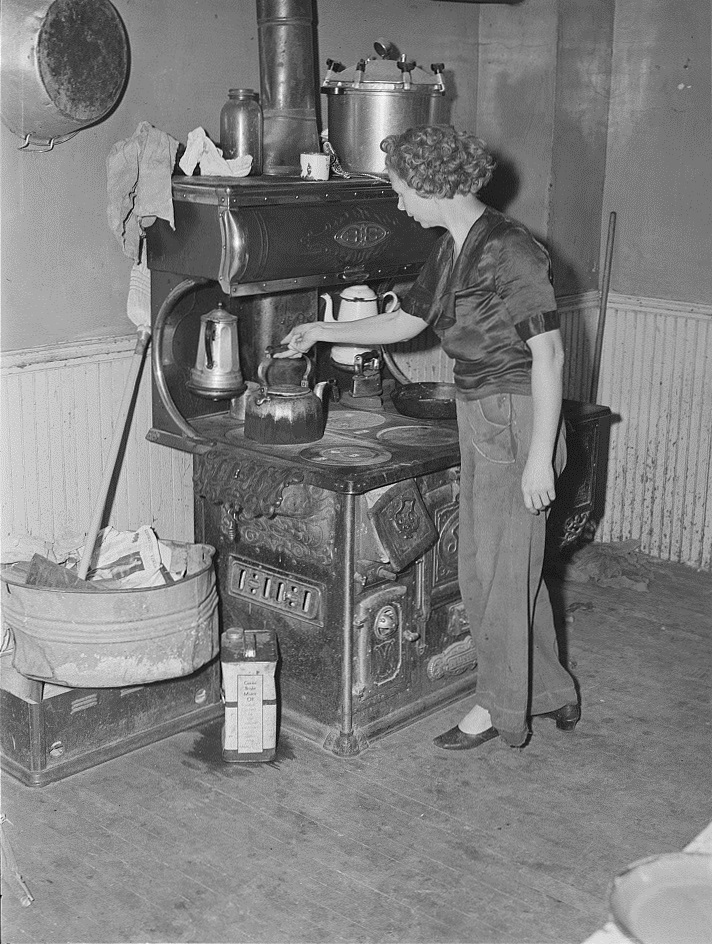
Metal can of motor oil next to wood-burning stove and oven; used for getting the fire going; 1940

Motor oils were sold at retail in glass bottles, metal cans, and metal-cardboard cans, before the advent of the current polyethylene plastic bottle, which began to appear in the early 1980s. Reusable spouts were made separately from the cans; with a piercing point like that of a can opener, these spouts could be used to puncture the top of the can and to provide an easy way to pour the oil.

Today, motor oil in the U.S. is generally sold in bottles of one U.S. quart (950 mL) and on a rarity in one-liter (33.8 U.S. fl oz) as well as in larger plastic containers ranging from approximately 4.4 to 5 liters (4.6 to 5.3 U.S. qt) due to most small to mid-size engines requiring around 3.6 to 5.2 liters (3.8 to 5.5 U.S. qt) of engine oil. In the rest of the world, it is most commonly available in 1L, 3L, 4L, and 5L retail packages.

Distribution to larger users (such as drive-through oil change shops) is often in bulk, by tanker truck or in one barrel (160 L) drums, in Europe 208 litres (55 US gal) and 60 litres (16 US gal) drums are common.

== Dangers ==
Human ingestion of motor oil is dangerous. Ingesting small amounts of unused motor oil will generally result in loose stools or diarrhea. The motor oil could also aspirate. This can cause: coughing, wheezing, or trouble breathing. If the skin comes in contact with motor oil defatting can occur. If exposed to an open flame motor oil could ignite.

== See also ==
- Waste oil
- Tribology
