= Polyolester =

Family of synthetic refrigeration lubricants

Polyolester of pentaerythritol

Polyolester of di-pentaerythritol

Polyolester oil (POE oil) is a type of wax-free synthetic oils used in refrigeration compressors that is compatible with the refrigerants R-134a, R-410A, and R-12. POE oils are used as a lubricant in systems using the refrigerant HFC-134a when replacing CFC-12, as these systems traditionally use mineral oil, which HFC-134a does not mix well with. These oils are used with chlorine-free hydrofluorocarbon (HFC) refrigeration systems, as they provide better lubrication and stability and are more miscible with HFC refrigerants compared to synthetic and mineral oils of similar application. The dispersion behavior of POE oils has been studied for applications in nanotechnology.

== Properties ==
The properties of POE oils are best described in comparison to lubricant mineral oils. POE oils are more hygroscopic, and react in air to form carboxylic acids. They typically have lower viscosity indexes than polyalkylene glycol (PAG) or poly-alpha-olefin (poly-α-olefin, PAO) oils, and higher viscosity grades are required in order to attain useful kinematic viscosity at higher oil temperatures.

=== Issues in application ===
The same properties that make POE oil a solvent for oils also make it a solvent for other pieces of matter left behind during the manufacturing of a unit, such as dust, dirt, residue from soldering, small metal bits, and oxidized metal from the tubing. The residues collected can clog the system filters and cause excessive wear or damage to components such as the vanes or valves.

== See also ==
- Pentaerythritol tetraacrylate
