= Dixie Speedway =

3/8 mile clay oval in Woodstock, Georgia

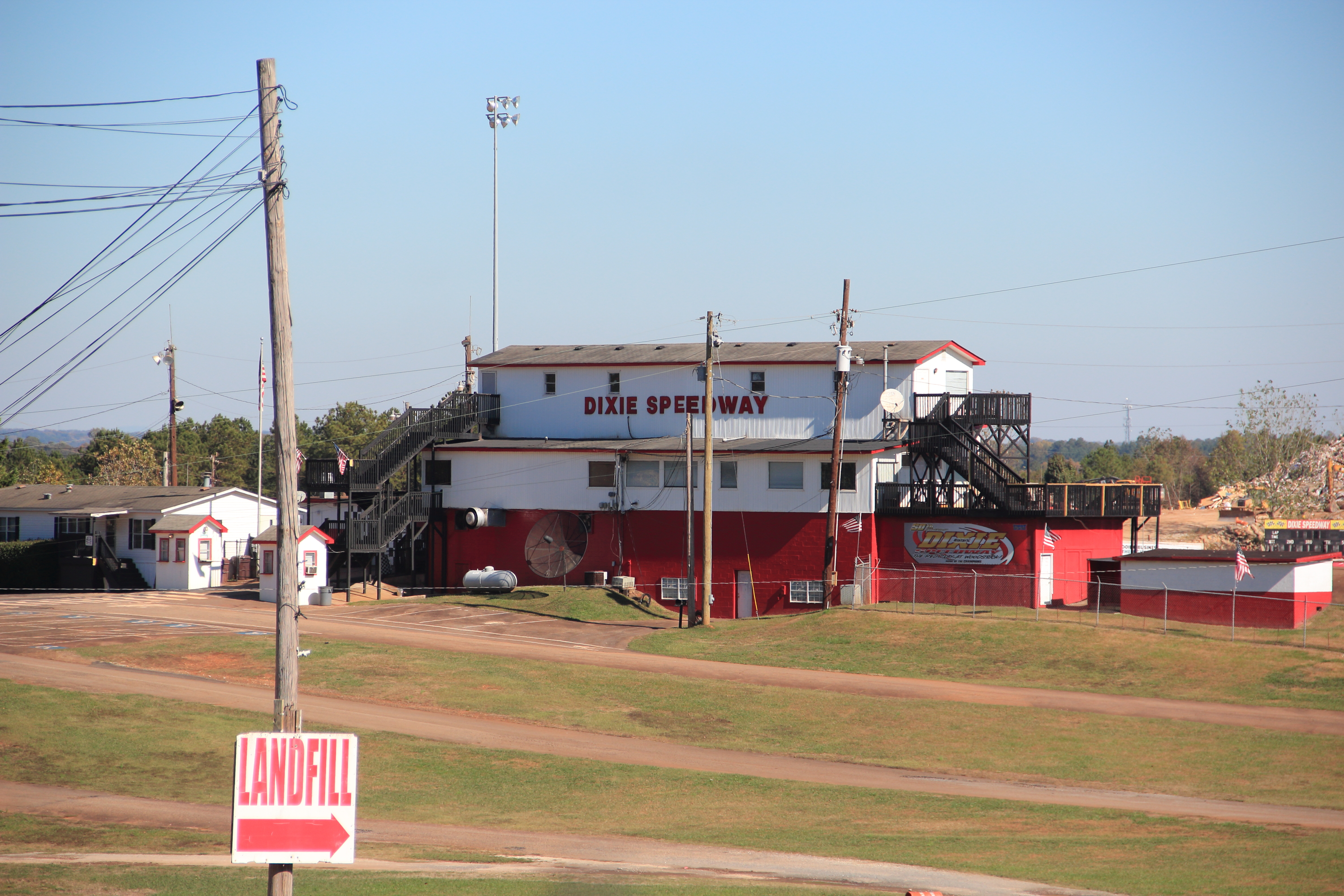
- Dixie Speedway in 2019
- Location: 150 Dixie Dr; Woodstock, Georgia, 30189
- Coordinates: 34°05′23″N 84°33′36″W
- Capacity: 5,000
- Owner: Mickey & Martha Swims
- Opened: 1968
- Major events: American Flat Track; Atlanta Short Track; Lucas Oil Late Model Dirt Series; Dixie Shootout
- Website: www.dixiespeedway.com

D-shaped oval (1968–present)
- Surface: Red clay
- Length: 0.375 mi (0.604 km)
- Turns: 4
- Banking: Progressive

Dixie Speedway is a 3/8 mile clay oval in Woodstock, Georgia. Located 30 miles north of Downtown Atlanta, the track features over 5,000 permanent seats on a 150-acre property. Opened in 1968, the venue has been owned by Mickey and Martha Swims since 1976. Touring series that visit the speedway include American Flat Track and the Late Model Dirt Series by Lucas Oil. The track also holds a season-opening doubleheader, the Schaeffer's Oil Spring Nationals, in cooperation with nearby Rome Speedway.

Dixie Speedway is noted to be the first track where NASCAR Legend Bill Elliot started racing, and is also the site where he won his first race.

Dixie Speedway was built long before Woodstock was known as a bustling and growing town like it is today. Dixie Speedway was established in 1969 and for most of its existence has been owned by the Swims family. Laid out over 150 acres, the 3/8 mile red clay dirt track has served millions of fans over its 50-year history. More than a million square feet of event space and a permanent seating capacity of over 5,000, makes Dixie Speedway one of the most flexible event venues in the state of Georgia. Known for its family-friendly atmosphere, Dixie Speedway doesn't permit alcohol sales, adheres to a midnight curfew and at most events children eight and under are admitted free.

The track's legacy has been recognized nationwide. Dixie Speedway was inducted into the National Dirt Racing Hall of Fame, voted North Georgia's premier dirt track and tourist destination by USA Today along with many local and national awards. Because of its homegrown atmosphere and local southern aesthetic, the track is home to many film projects, including being the featured location for the 2017 dirt track racing movie Champion. Other film projects include the 1970s classic Kenny Rogers 'Six Pack', 'Thank You For Your Service', and Billy Lynn's 'Long Halftime Walk' as well as being named to Georgia's film selfie spot tour. Dixie Speedway is also host to more than 20 events every year such as weekly and national touring start car races, outlaw sprint cars, AMA flat track motorcycle racing, monster truck nationals, concerts, and more.

== History ==
Highway 92 was empty prior to the opening of Dixie Speedway. First opened in 1969 as a dirt track, it was paved for a time and then converted back to dirt. Racing legend Bud Lunsford and Cherokee County businessman Max Simpson were among the early owners and operators, but for the greatest part of its existence, Dixie has been operated by the Swims family. Many legends got their start there, such as Bill Elliott, who got his first racing win there. Many local families who race are relatives of past contestants.

May 23, 2009 marked the 40th anniversary of Dixie Speedway. The anniversary was a notable historical event for the track, allowing people to see those who had raced on the track in the past.

Dixie Speedway has been owned by the Swim's family for the majority of its operation. Operations are run by a son-in-law, daughter-in-law, and four grandchildren. Mike Swims, the promoter, general manager, and vice president died on September 2007 after a seven year battle with cancer.

In early 2020, Dixie Speedway closed due to concerns about COVID-19. Since then, the track has suffered the loss of Martha Swims due to cancer. The track officially reopened on Saturday, April 6, 2024 to a sold out crowd and featured a demolition derby.

== Races ==
- American Flat Track
  - Yamaha Atlanta Short Track presented by Cycle Gear
- Lucas Oil Late Model Dirt Series
  - Lucas Oil Dixie Shootout
- USCS Outlaw Thunder Tour

=== Records ===
- Sprint car: Joe Gaerte, 0:12.190
- Super late model: David Payne, 0:13.579

== Notable Drivers ==
- Bill Elliott
- Chase Elliott
- Dave Blaney
- Richard Petty
- Tony Stewart
- Kasey Kahne
- Ray Evernham
- Ken Schrader
- David Gilliland
- Dale Earnhardt
- Bud Lunsford
- Bobby Allison
- Scott Bloomquist
- Charlie Mincey
