= Lubricant =

Substance introduced to reduce friction between surfaces in mutual contact

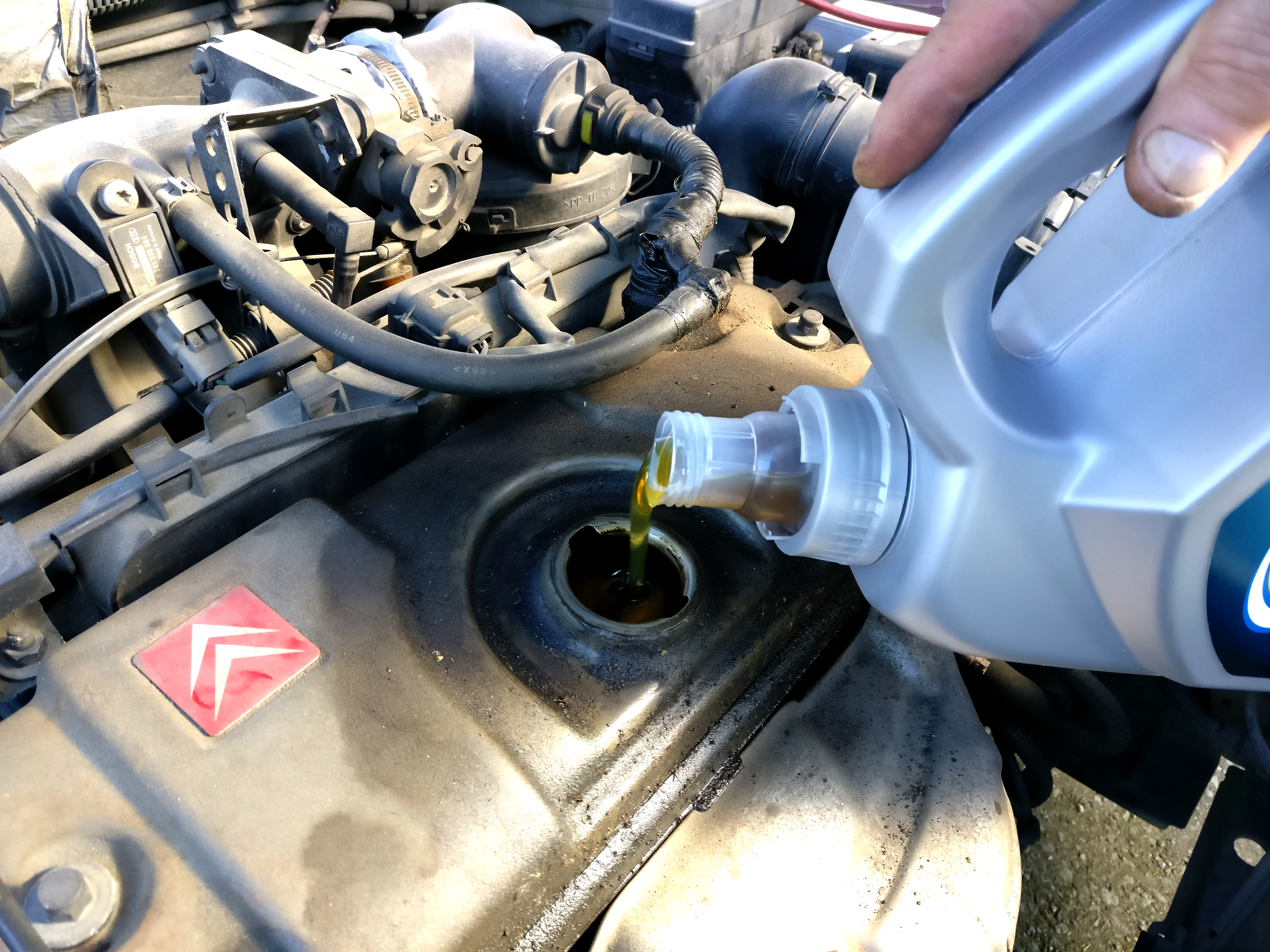
Motor oil, a common lubricant

A lubricant (sometimes shortened to lube) is a substance that helps to reduce friction between surfaces in mutual contact, which ultimately reduces the heat generated when the surfaces move. It may also have the function of transmitting forces, transporting foreign particles, or heating or cooling the surfaces. A lubricant's effectiveness against friction is measured as its lubricity and the study of lubrication in material science is known as tribology.

In addition to industrial applications, lubricants are used for many other purposes. Other uses include cooking (oils and fats in use in frying pans and baking to prevent food sticking), to reduce rusting and friction in machinery (through the use of motor oil and grease), and bioapplications on humans (e.g., lubricants for artificial joints, ultrasound examination, medical examination, and sexual intercourse). It is mainly used to reduce friction and to contribute to a better, more efficient functioning of a mechanism.

== History ==
Lubricants have been in some use for thousands of years. Calcium soaps have been identified on the axles of chariots dated to 1400 BC. Building stones were slid on oil-impregnated lumber during the construction of the Egyptian pyramids. In the Roman era, lubricants were based on olive oil and rapeseed oil, as well as animal fats. The development of lubrication accelerated in the Industrial Revolution to match the rise of metal-based machinery. Whale oil was a historically important lubricant, with some uses up to the latter part of the 20th century as a friction modifier additive for automatic transmission fluid. Relying initially on natural oils, needs for such machinery shifted toward petroleum-based materials early in the 1900s. A breakthrough came with the development of vacuum distillation of petroleum, as developed by the Vacuum Oil Company. This technology allowed the purification of very non-volatile substances, which are common in many lubricants.

In 1999, an estimated 37,300,000 tons of lubricants were consumed worldwide. Automotive applications dominate, including electric vehicles but other industrial, marine, and metal working applications are also big consumers of lubricants. Although air and other gas-based lubricants are known (e.g., in fluid bearings), liquid lubricants dominate the market, followed by solid lubricants.

== Liquid lubricants ==
Most lubricants are composed of a majority of "Base oil", often a viscous liquid hydrocarbon, plus a variety of additives. Many lubricants contain no additives, e.g. compressor and hydraulic oils. On the other hand, greases, metalworking fluids, and gear lubricants can contain up to 30% additives by weight.

=== Base oil ===
The base oil is the main component of all liquid lubricants. Two main types of base oils are mineral oil and synthetic oils

==== Mineral oil ====
The term "mineral oil" is used to refer to lubricating base oils derived from crude oil. The American Petroleum Institute (API) designates several types of lubricant base oil:

- Group I – Saturates < 90% and/or sulfur > 0.03%, and Society of Automotive Engineers (SAE) viscosity index (VI) of 80 to 120

Manufactured by solvent extraction, solvent or catalytic dewaxing, and hydro-finishing processes. Common Group I base oil are 150SN (solvent neutral), 500SN, and 150BS (brightstock)

- Group II – Saturates > 90% and sulfur < 0.03%, and SAE viscosity index of 80 to 120

Manufactured by hydrocracking and solvent or catalytic dewaxing processes. Group II base oil has superior anti-oxidation properties since virtually all hydrocarbon molecules are saturated. It has water-white color.

- Group III – Saturates > 90%, sulfur < 0.03%, and SAE viscosity index over 120

Manufactured by special processes such as isohydromerization. Can be manufactured from base oil or slax wax from dewaxing process.

- Group IV – Polyalphaolefins (PAO)
- Group V – All others not included above, such as naphthenics, polyalkylene glycols (PAG), and polyesters.

The lubricant industry commonly extends this group terminology to include:

- Group I+ with a viscosity index of 103–108
- Group II+ with a viscosity index of 113–119
- Group III+ with a viscosity index of at least 140

Can also be classified into three categories depending on the prevailing compositions: paraffinic, naphthenic, and aromatic.

==== Synthetic oils ====
Petroleum-derived lubricant can also be produced using synthetic hydrocarbons (derived ultimately from petroleum), "synthetic oils".

These include:

- Polyalpha-olefin (PAO)
- Synthetic esters
- Polyalkylene glycols (PAG)
- Phosphate esters
- Perfluoropolyether (PFPE)
- Alkylated naphthalenes (AN)
- Silicate esters
- Ionic fluids
- Multiply alkylated cyclopentanes (MAC)

=== Additives ===
A large number of additives are used to impart performance characteristics to the lubricants. Modern automotive lubricants contain as many as ten additives, comprising up to 20% of the lubricant, the main families of additives are:

- Pour point depressants are compounds that prevent crystallization of waxes. Long chain alkylbenzenes adhere to small crystallites of wax, preventing crystal growth.
- Anti-foaming agents are typically silicone compounds which increase surface tension in order to discourage foam formation.
- Viscosity index improvers (VIIs) are compounds that allow lubricants to remain viscous at higher temperatures. Typical VIIs are polyacrylates and butadiene.
- Antioxidants suppress the rate of oxidative degradation of the hydrocarbon molecules within the lubricant. At low temperatures, free radical inhibitors such as hindered phenols are used, e.g. butylated hydroxytoluene. At temperatures > 90 °C, where the metals catalyze the oxidation process, dithiophosphates are more useful. In the latter application the additives are called metal deactivators.
- Detergents ensure the cleanliness of engine components by preventing the formation of deposits on contact surfaces at high temperatures.
- Corrosion inhibitors (rust inhibitors) are usually alkaline materials, such as alkylsulfonate salts, that absorb acids that would corrode metal parts.
- Anti-wear additives form protective 'tribofilms' on metal parts, suppressing wear. They come in two classes depending on the strength with which they bind to the surface. Popular examples include phosphate esters and zinc dithiophosphates.
- Extreme pressure (anti-scuffing) additives form protective films on sliding metal parts. These agents are often sulfur compounds, such as dithiophosphates.
- Friction modifiers reduce friction and wear, particularly in the boundary lubrication regime where surfaces come into direct contact.

== Solid lubricants ==
PTFE: polytetrafluoroethylene (PTFE) is typically used as a coating layer on, for example, cooking utensils to provide a non-stick surface. Its usable temperature range up to 350 °C and chemical inertness make it a useful additive in special greases, where it can function both as a thickener and a lubricant. Under extreme pressures, PTFE powder or solids is of little value as it is soft and flows away from the area of contact. Ceramic or metal or alloy lubricants must be used then.

Inorganic solids: Graphite, hexagonal boron nitride, molybdenum disulfide and tungsten disulfide are examples of solid lubricants. Some retain their lubricity to very high temperatures. The use of some such materials is sometimes restricted by their poor resistance to oxidation (e.g., molybdenum disulfide degrades above 350 °C in air, but 1100 °C in reducing environments).

Metal/alloy: Metal alloys, composites and pure metals can be used as grease additives or the sole constituents of sliding surfaces and bearings. Cadmium and gold are used for plating surfaces which gives them good corrosion resistance and sliding properties, Lead, tin, zinc alloys and various bronze alloys are used as sliding bearings, or their powder can be used to lubricate sliding surfaces alone.

== Greases ==
Greases are a solid or semi-solid lubricant produced by blending thickening agents within a liquid lubricant. Greases are typically composed of about 80% lubricating oil, around 5% to 10% thickener, and approximately 10% to 15% additives. In most common greases, the thickener is a light or alkali metal soap, forming a sponge-like structure that encapsulates the oil droplets. Beyond lubrication, greases are generally expected to provide corrosion protection, typically achieved through additives. To prevent drying out at higher temperatures, dry lubricants are also added. By selecting appropriate oils, thickeners, and additives, the properties of greases can be optimized for a wide range of applications. There are greases suited for high or extremely low temperatures, vacuum applications, water-resistant and weatherproof greases, highly pressure-resistant or creeping types, food-grade, or exceptionally adhesive greases.

== Functions ==
A good lubricant generally possesses the following characteristics:

- A high boiling point and low freezing point (in order to stay liquid within a wide range of temperature)
- A high viscosity index
- Thermal stability
- Hydraulic stability
- Demulsibility
- Corrosion prevention
- A high resistance to oxidation
- Pour point (the minimum temperature at which oil will flow under prescribed test conditions)

One of the largest applications for lubricants, in the form of motor oil, is protecting the internal combustion engines in motor vehicles and powered equipment.

=== Lubricant vs. anti-tack coating ===
Anti-tack or anti-stick coatings are designed to reduce the adhesive condition (stickiness) of a given material. The rubber, hose, and wire and cable industries are the largest consumers of anti-tack products but virtually every industry uses some form of anti-sticking agent. Anti-sticking agents differ from lubricants in that they are designed to reduce the inherently adhesive qualities of a given compound while lubricants are designed to reduce friction between any two surfaces.

=== Keep moving parts apart ===
Lubricants are typically used to separate moving parts in a system. This separation has the benefit of reducing friction, wear and surface fatigue, together with reduced heat generation, operating noise and vibrations. Lubricants achieve this in several ways. The most common is by forming a physical barrier i.e., a thin layer of lubricant separates the moving parts. This is analogous to hydroplaning, the loss of friction observed when a car tire is separated from the road surface by moving through standing water. This is termed hydrodynamic lubrication. In cases of high surface pressures or temperatures, the fluid film is much thinner and some of the forces are transmitted between the surfaces through the lubricant.

=== Reduce friction ===
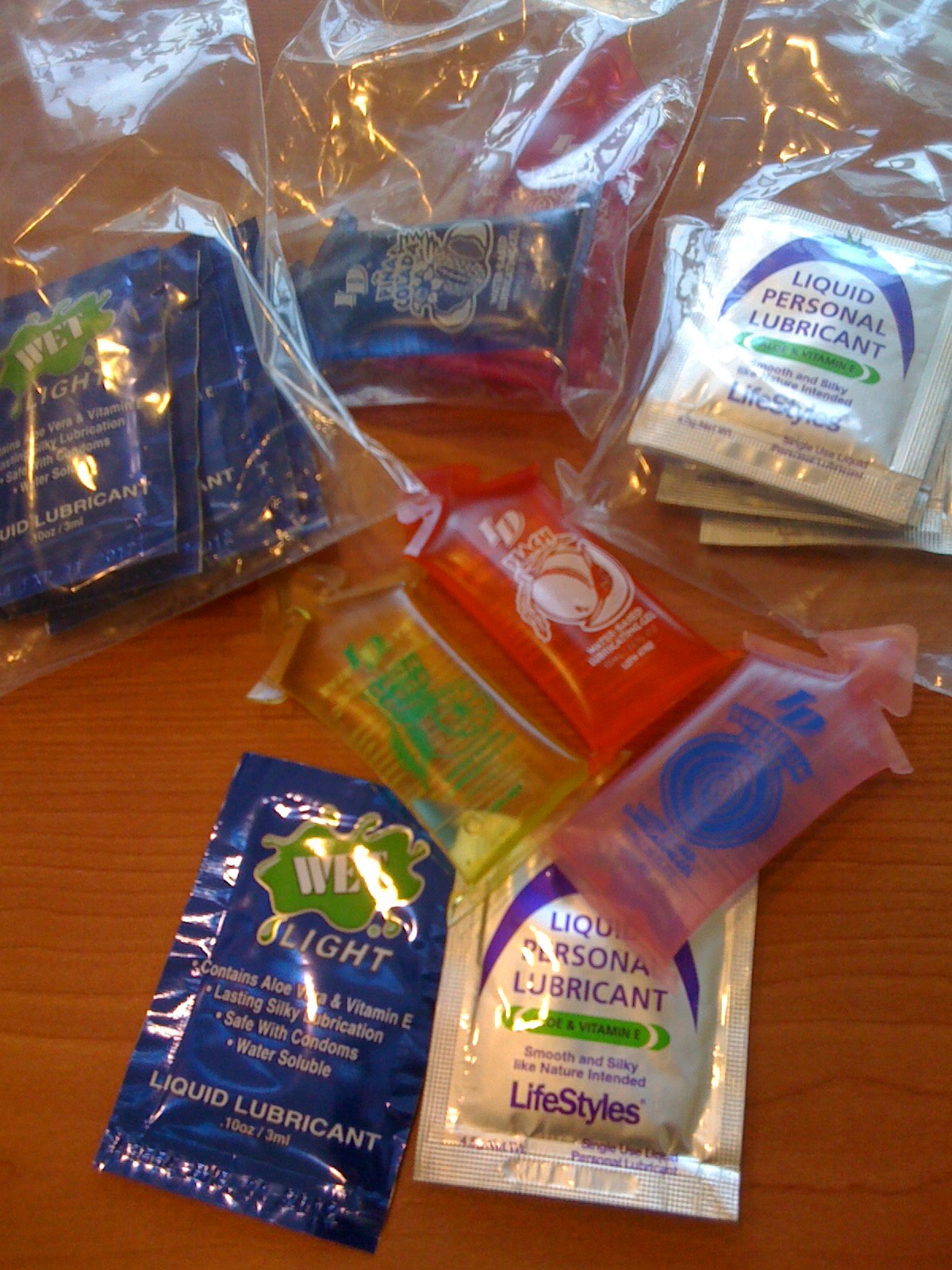
Lubricants are also used for sexual activities.

Typically the lubricant-to-surface friction is much less than surface-to-surface friction in a system without any lubrication. Thus use of a lubricant reduces the overall system friction. Reduced friction has the benefit of reducing heat generation and reduced formation of wear particles as well as improved efficiency. Lubricants may contain polar additives known as friction modifiers that chemically bind to metal surfaces to reduce surface friction even when there is insufficient bulk lubricant present for hydrodynamic lubrication, e.g. protecting the valve train in a car engine at startup. The base oil itself might also be polar in nature and as a result inherently able to bind to metal surfaces, as with polyolester oils.

=== Transfer heat ===
Both gas and liquid lubricants can transfer heat. However, liquid lubricants are much more effective on account of their high specific heat capacity. Typically the liquid lubricant is constantly circulated to and from a cooler part of the system, although lubricants may be used to warm as well as to cool when a regulated temperature is required. This circulating flow also determines the amount of heat that is carried away in any given unit of time. High flow systems can carry away a lot of heat and have the additional benefit of reducing the thermal stress on the lubricant. Thus lower cost liquid lubricants may be used. The primary drawback is that high flows typically require larger sumps and bigger cooling units. A secondary drawback is that a high flow system that relies on the flow rate to protect the lubricant from thermal stress is susceptible to catastrophic failure during sudden system shut downs. An automotive oil-cooled turbocharger is a typical example. Turbochargers get red hot during operation and the oil that is cooling them only survives as its residence time in the system is very short (i.e. high flow rate). If the system is shut down suddenly (pulling into a service area after a high-speed drive and stopping the engine) the oil that is in the turbo charger immediately oxidizes and will clog the oil ways with deposits. Over time these deposits can completely block the oil ways, reducing the cooling with the result that the turbo charger experiences total failure, typically with seized bearings. Non-flowing lubricants such as greases and pastes are not effective at heat transfer although they do contribute by reducing the generation of heat in the first place.

=== Carry away contaminants and debris ===
Lubricant circulation systems have the benefit of carrying away internally generated debris and external contaminants that get introduced into the system to a filter where they can be removed. Lubricants for machines that regularly generate debris or contaminants such as automotive engines typically contain detergent and dispersant additives to assist in debris and contaminant transport to the filter and removal. Over time the filter will get clogged and require cleaning or replacement, hence the recommendation to change a car's oil filter at the same time as changing the oil. In closed systems such as gear boxes the filter may be supplemented by a magnet to attract any iron fines that get created.

It is apparent that in a circulatory system the oil will only be as clean as the filter can make it, thus it is unfortunate that there are no industry standards by which consumers can readily assess the filtering ability of various automotive filters. Poor automotive filters significantly reduce the life of the machine (engine) as well as make the system inefficient.

=== Transmit power ===
Lubricants known as hydraulic fluid are used as the working fluid in hydrostatic power transmission. Hydraulic fluids comprise a large portion of all lubricants produced in the world. The automatic transmission's torque converter is another important application for power transmission with lubricants.

=== Protect against wear ===
Lubricants prevent wear by reducing friction between two parts. Lubricants may also contain anti-wear or extreme pressure additives to boost their performance against wear and fatigue.

=== Prevent corrosion and rusting ===
Many lubricants are formulated with additives that form chemical bonds with surfaces or that exclude moisture, to prevent corrosion and rust. It reduces corrosion between two metallic surfaces and avoids contact between these surfaces to avoid immersed corrosion.

=== Seal for gases ===
Lubricants will occupy the clearance between moving parts through the capillary force, thus sealing the clearance. This effect can be used to seal pistons and shafts.

== Disposal and environmental impact ==
Domestic and industrial groups consume large amounts of lubricants. It is estimated that only half of that material is consumed in performing its function, the remainder is waste or pollution. Recovered lubricants require treatment, and the treated product is less valuable than the original. Even though the wastes are biodegradable, the scale of the pollution overwhelms many environments. The obvious solution to this problem entails the use of biodegradable lubricants, although challenges remain with respect to cost and performance. Some biodegradable lubricants are based on:

- Vegetable oil derived from rapeseed or sunflowers and their derivatives.
- Synthetic esters, an example being diisotridecyl adipate
- Poly(alkylene glycol)s

The development of biolubricants is topical.

== Societies and industry bodies ==
- American Petroleum Institute (API)
- Society of Tribologists and Lubrication Engineers (STLE)
- National Lubricating Grease Institute (NLGI)
- Society of Automotive Engineers (SAE)
- Independent Lubricant Manufacturer Association (ILMA)
- European Automobile Manufacturers Association (ACEA)
- Japanese Automotive Standards Organization (JASO)
- Petroleum Packaging Council (PPC)

== See also ==
- Lubrication – Presence of a material to reduce friction between two surfaces
- Motor oil – Lubricant used for internal combustion engines
- Oil analysis – Laboratory analysis of an oil based lubricant's properties and contaminants
- Penetrating oil – Low-viscosity oil
- Tribology – Science of rubbing surfaces
