= Cold-cranking simulator =

Engine tuning instrument

The cold-cranking simulator (CCS) is a device used to determine the low temperature performance of lubricants, when starting a cold engine (i.e. cold-cranking). In this condition, the only energy available to turn the engine comes from the starter motor and the battery, and it has been widely assumed that the system acts as a constant power viscometer. The use of this device for this purpose is standardized as ASTM D5293.

== Test development ==
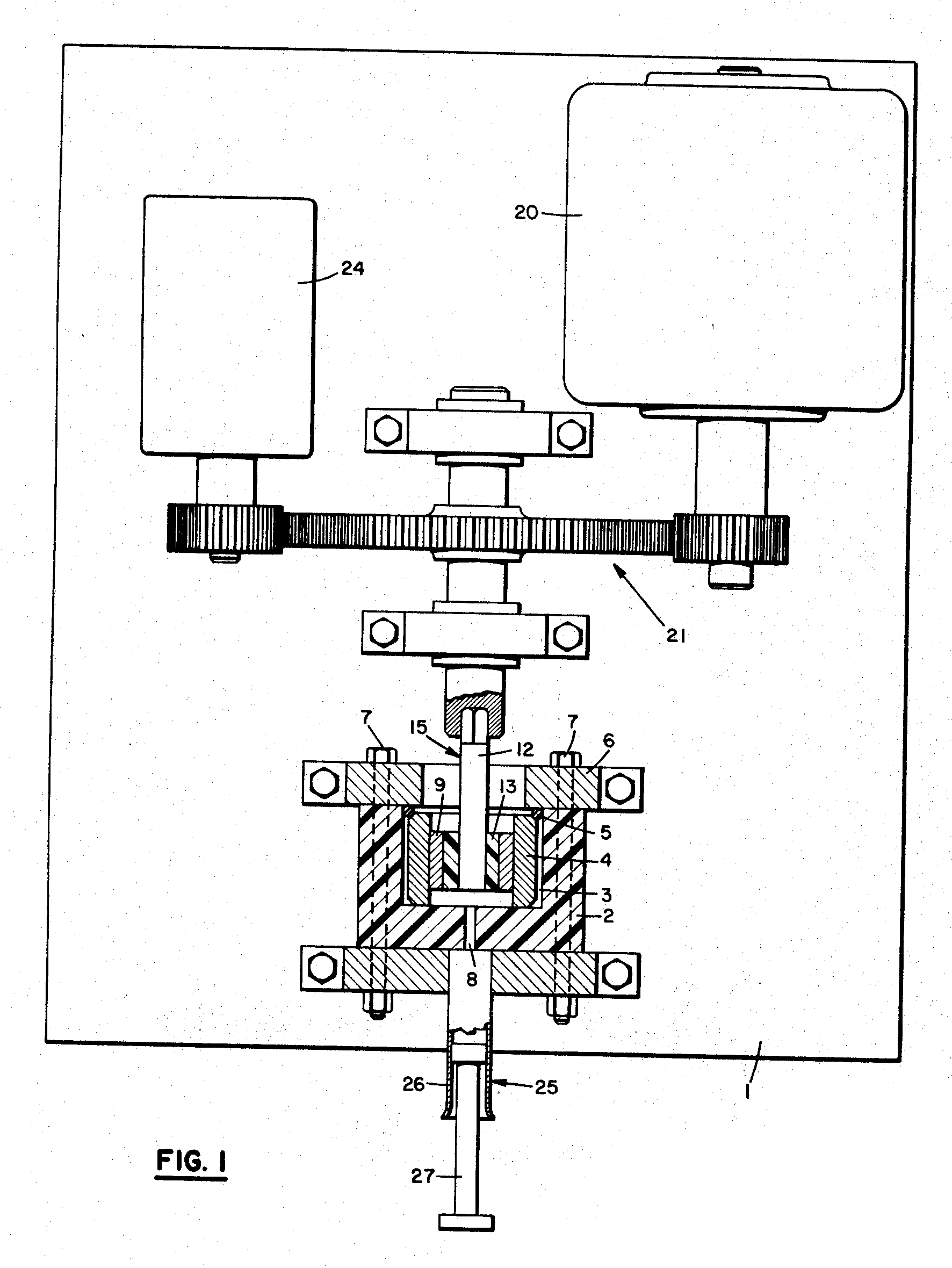
Figure 1 of US Patent 3350922

The cold-cranking simulator was invented developed by Dr. Dae Sik Kim of Esso Research and Engineering Company in 1964. The first prototype was built on his apartment kitchen table with Unimat, a miniature lathe/milling machine, to minimize and avoid proper company procedures. He reported the results of his developmental work, titled: "Results of Cold Cranking Simulator and a Comment" at SAE Fuels and Lubricants Meeting in Palmer house, Chicago on May 18, 1965. Although the device was initially called "Kimometer", he refused to put his name on it and he named it for what it was intended.

== Purpose of this test ==
Cold-cranking simulator simulates rheological process of "an average engine" during cold starting. The engine's starter motor was replaced with a small series wound universal motor, a typical sewing machine motor, and the engine, with a specially designed cold cylinder and an insulated cylindrical rotor with a pair of parallel flats. The sample oil is continuously sheared under a periodically varying shear rate, lower when the flats pass. Oils in real engines are similarly sheared, high in the journal bearings, oscillatory on piston rings and low in galley. Most developmental work went into proper sizing of the flat to simulate relative shear rate distribution in an "average engine". Both an engine and simulator is calibrated with a set of Newtonian standard crank case oils with known viscosities.

When SAE and ASTM decided to use the simulator for their future standard instrument, Esso R & E Company gave a free exclusive license to Cannon Instrument Co of State College, PA to avoid conflict of interest.

During the past four decades many marginal improvements have been made but the basic design and idea remains the same. Various generations of the CCS have been made over the years, with the latest Cannon CCS-2100 utilising Peltier cooling and an associated chiller to operate essentially the same instrument as the original 1960s design.

In the late 1980s Ravenfield Designs, Heywood, England, redesigned the entire system from the ground up, utilising a novel system to accurately model the old instruments and created a new machine offering higher repeatability and reproducibility than former methods. The Ravenfield apparatus, designated Model CS is markedly smaller than the Cannon apparatus, incorporating the cooler, the PC, the instrument and sample pumping in a 600 mm square footprint.

The Society of Automotive Engineers adopted the CCS test as part of the J300 specification, and is the subject of ASTM test method D5293.
