= SAE J300 =

Standard for engine oil

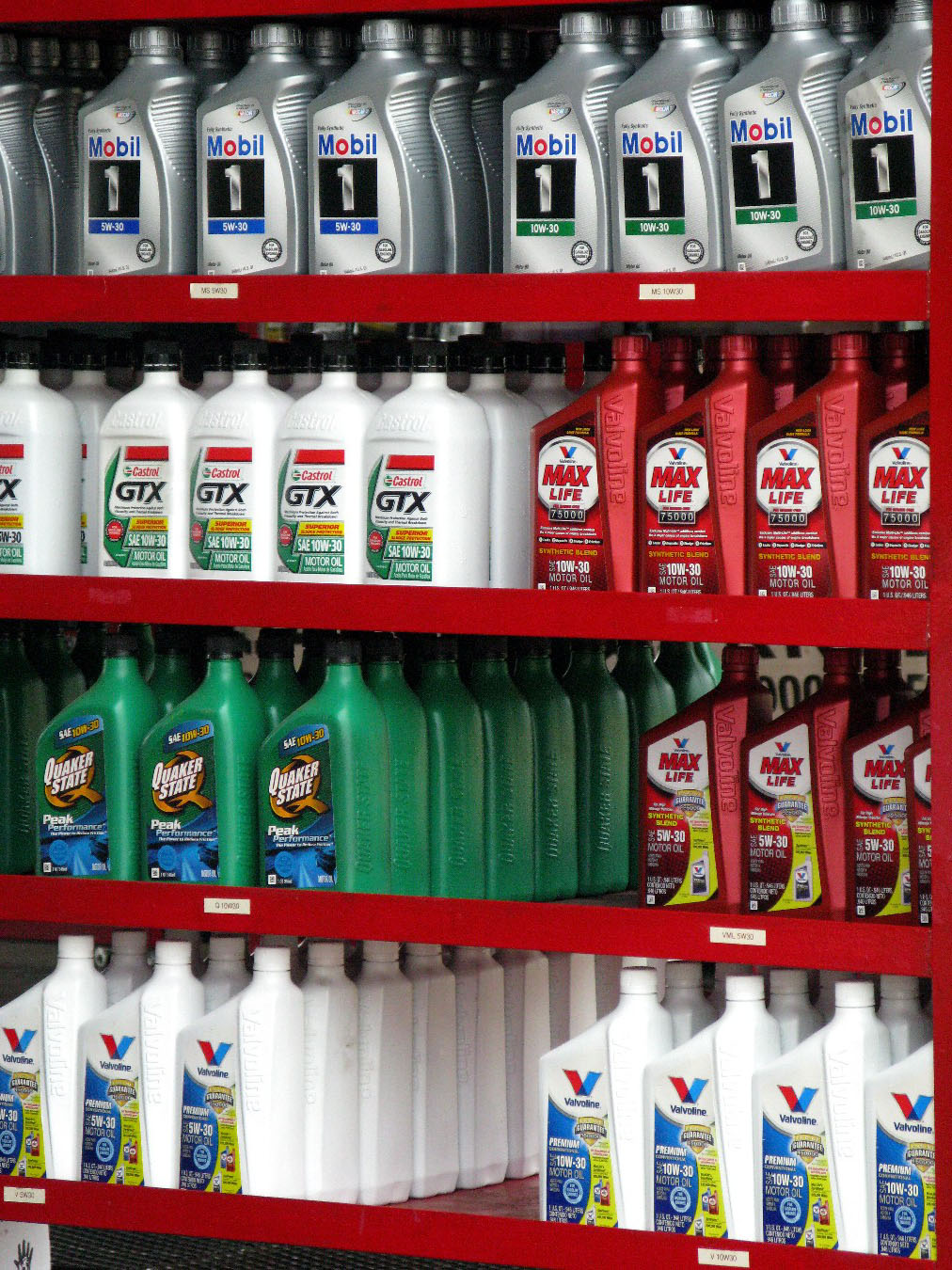
Different brands and grades of bottled motor oil at a store

SAE J300 is a standard that defines the viscometric properties of mono- and multigrade engine oils, maintained by SAE International. Key parameters for engine oil viscometrics are the oil's kinematic viscosity, its high temperature-high shear viscosity measured by the tapered bearing simulator, and low temperature properties measured by the cold-cranking simulator and mini-rotary viscometer. This standard is commonly used throughout the world, and standards organizations that do so include API and ILSAC, and ACEA.

The SAE has a separate viscosity rating system for gear, axle, and manual transmission oils, SAE J306, which should not be confused with engine oil viscosity. The higher numbers of a gear oil (e.g., 75W-140) does not mean that it has higher viscosity than an engine oil 20W-50.

== Grades ==
In the SAE J300 standard (2021), the viscosity grades are 0W, 5W, 10W, 15W, 20W, 25W, 8, 12, 16, 20, 30, 40, 50, and 60. In the United States, these numbers are often referred to as the "weight" of a motor oil, and single-grade motor oils are often called "straight-weight" oils. The grades with a W designation are considered Winter-grades, and denote an engine oil's low-temperature properties, while non-winter grades denote an engine oil's properties at the operating temperature of an engine. The SAE 8 through SAE 16 viscosity grades describe oils that can improve fuel economy through reduced hydrodynamic friction.

SAE J300 winter grades (2021)
Grade	Low-temperature CCS viscosity (cP) (max)	Low-temperature pumping viscosity (cP) (max)	Kinematic viscosity (cSt)@100 °C (min)
0W	6,200 @-35 °C	60,000 @-40 °C	3.8
5W	6,600 @-30 °C	60,000 @-35 °C	3.8
10W	7,000 @-25 °C	60,000 @-30 °C	4.1
15W	7,000 @-20 °C	60,000 @-25 °C	5.6
20W	9,500 @-15 °C	60,000 @-20 °C	5.6
25W	13,000 @-10 °C	60,000 @-15 °C	9.3

To assign winter grades, the dynamic viscosity is measured at various cold temperatures, specified in J300, in units of mPa·s, or the equivalent older non-SI units, centipoise (abbreviated cP), using two test methods. They are the cold-cranking simulator (CCS, ASTM D5293) and the mini-rotary viscometer (pumping, ASTM D4684). Each temperature is associated with a grade, SAE 0W, 5W, 10W, 15W, 20W, or 25W, with higher grade numbers corresponding to higher temperatures. The oil fails the test at a particular temperature if the oil is too viscous. The grade of the oil is that associated with the coldest temperature at which the oil passes the test. For example, if an oil passes at the specified temperatures for 10W and 5W, but fails at the 0W temperature, the oil is grade 5W. It cannot be labeled 0W or 10W.

SAE J300 non-winter grades (2021)
Grade	Kinematic viscosity (cSt)@100 °C (min)	Kinematic viscosity (cSt)@100 °C (max)	HTHS viscosity (cP)@150 °C (min)
8	4.0	<6.1	1.70
12	5.0	<7.1	2.0
16	6.1	<8.2	2.3
20	6.9	<9.3	2.6
30	9.3	<12.5	2.9
40	12.5	<16.3	3.5 or 3.7
50	16.3	<21.9	3.7
60	21.9	<26.1	3.7

To assign non-winter grades, kinematic viscosity is graded by ASTM D445 or ASTM D7042, measuring the time it takes for a standard amount of oil at a temperature of 100 °C (212 °F) to flow through a standard orifice, in units of mm^{2}/s (millimetre squared per second) or the equivalent older non-SI units, centistokes (abbreviated cSt). The longer it takes, the higher the viscosity and thus the higher the SAE code. Larger numbers are thicker. J300 specifies a viscosity range for each non-winter grade, with higher grade numbers corresponding to higher viscosities. In addition, a minimum viscosity measured at a high temperature and high-shear rate (HTHS, ASTM D4683) is also required.

=== Multi-grade designations ===
Grades may appear alone - for example, a lawnmower may require SAE 30. This single grade specification means that the oil must meet the SAE 30 requirements. But SAE also allows designating an oil with two viscosity grades, referred to as a multi-grade oil. For example, 10W-30 designates a common multi-grade oil. A 10W-30 oil must pass the SAE J300 viscosity grade requirements for both 10W and 30, and all limitations placed on the viscosity grades, such as the requirement that a 10W oil must fail the 5W requirements.

Viscosity index improvers (VIIs) are special polymer additives added to oil, usually to improve cold weather performance in passenger vehicles. If any VIIs are used, the oil must be labeled with a multi-grade designation. Otherwise, an oil not containing VIIs can be labeled as multi-grade or single grade. For example, a 20W-20 oil can be easily made with modern base oils without any VIIs. This oil can be labeled as 20W-20, 20W, or 20.

== History ==
Before the discovery of oil fields in Pennsylvania, lubricating oils primarily consisted of animal and vegetable oils like lard and castor oil. However, with the opening of these fields, petroleum-based lubricants quickly entered the market. Initially, there was skepticism surrounding these petroleum oils, seen as inferior to their animal and vegetable counterparts. To cut costs, some started blending petroleum oils with animal or vegetable oils, often selling these mixtures at regular prices without disclosing the presence of petroleum oils. This practice of adulteration was frowned upon, prompting chemists and oil experts to develop tests to detect such fraud. Tests such as viscosity, specific gravity, flash point, fire point, pour point, acid number, and saponification number were devised to distinguish between petroleum and animal/vegetable oils. Of these, while some such as viscosity were relevant to selecting the right oil for an application, most were useful only for detecting adulteration. Often, specific test values were specified as requirements despite being irrelevant, unfairly giving the perception that Pennsylvania oil was inferior. Despite these difficulties, Pennsylvania oils gradually replaced animal and vegetable oils in many applications because they were cheap and gave good lubrication.

As oil fields in the Central, Western, and Southwestern regions of the United States began production, newer oils entered the market, competing with Pennsylvania oils. Chemists discovered variations in the properties of these oils compared to Pennsylvania oils. Again, these oils were often considered inferior solely on the basis of particular tests, despite these tests being unrelated to the specific application, but eventually the new oils developed a place for themselves based on their merits. Although the oils differed in their characteristics, most automobiles could be used with a large variety of oils.

In June 1911, SAE published Specification No. 26 for "automobile engine light lubricating oil", the first such formal specification. H. C. Dickinson, of the Bureau of Standards, similarly tried very hard to have the larger oil companies agree on the viscosities represented by the terms "light", "medium", "heavy", "extra heavy", and so on. These efforts were unsuccessful, since these names were tied up with the trademarks and advertising of the oil companies. Companies would market the same oil as a "heavy" automobile oil and a "light" tractor oil, and different companies might call this "heavy" automobile oil a "light" or "medium" automobile oil. Beginning in 1920, the SAE began efforts to draw up a more extensive set of specifications. In 1921, US government lubrication specifications were drawn up to facilitate the purchase of oil by the government. Representatives from the government, SAE, and the American Petroleum Institute met in 1922, resulting in SAE adopting a specification for 10 grades of oil in March 1923. This specification was not adopted for general use. Refiners felt that marking their oils with the SAE specifications would associate them with inferior oils. Also, the specifications included many tests that were irrelevant to automobile performance.

By 1926, it had become clear that the light/medium/heavy distinction was not practical for automobile users. In the fall of 1925, a joint meeting of SAE and ASTM committee members (automotive and oil engineers) worked out a new standard. The SAE adopted this standard in July 1926. This standard was similar to the modern single-grade standard in having grade numbers with no direct relationship to any measured property, but being ordered by ascending viscosity, and contained six grades 10 through 60. By 1928, the standard was being widely adopted by oil and automotive companies. Grade 70 was added in 1928. In 1933, SAE proposed 10W and 20W grades, which saw popular use despite never being formally adopted until 1950.

In 1950, the 10, 60, and 70 grades were dropped, new 5W, 10W, and 20W grades were added, and the testing criteria were simplified. The multi-grade labeling scheme was approved in 1955. The J300 identifier was attached around 1962. The criteria were reformulated in 1967 to use kinematic viscosity in centiStokes and the cold-cranking simulator. The 15W grade was added December 1975. In 1980, 0W and 25W grades were added, and a low-temperature pumpability test. Grade 60 was re-added in 1987. HTHS viscosity was added in 1992.

Grade 16 was added in 2013. Michael Covitch of Lubrizol, Chair of the SAE International Engine Oil Viscosity Classification (EOVC) task force was quoted stating "If we continued to count down from SAE 20 to 15 to 10, etc., we would be facing continuing customer confusion problems with popular low-temperature viscosity grades such as SAE 10W, SAE 5W, and SAE 0W," he noted. "By choosing to call the new viscosity grade SAE 16, we established a precedent for future grades, counting down by fours instead of fives: SAE 12, SAE 8, SAE 4." This revision also raised the minimum non-winter kinematic viscosity at 100°C from 5.6 cSt to 6.9 cSt. Manufacturers of hydraulically-actuated engine control devices requested the tighter viscosity tolerance, and SAE determined the previous lower-range limit was not being utilized in the market.

Grades 8 and 12 were added in 2015. The use of ASTM D7042 for determining low shear rate kinematic viscosity was added in 2021.
