= Base oil =

Type of petroleum product

Base oils are used to manufacture products including lubricating greases, motor oil and metal processing fluids. Different products require different compositions and properties in the oil. One of the most important factors is the liquid’s viscosity at various temperatures. Whether or not a crude oil is suitable to be made into a base oil is determined by the concentration of base oil molecules as well as how easily these can be extracted.

Base oil is produced by means of refining crude oil. This means that crude oil is heated in order to separate various distillates from one another. During the heating process, light and heavy hydrocarbons are separated – the light ones can be refined to make petrol and other fuels, while the heavier ones are suitable for bitumen and base oils.

There are large numbers of crude oils all around the world that are used to produce base oils. The most common one is a type of paraffinic crude oil, although there are also naphthenic crude oils that create products with better solubility and very good properties at low temperatures. By using hydrogenation technology, in which sulfur and aromatics are removed using hydrogen under high pressure, extremely pure base oils can be obtained, which are suitable when quality requirements are particularly stringent.

Chemical substances – additives – are added to the base oil in order to meet the quality requirements for the end products in terms of, for example, friction and cleaning properties. Certain types of motor oils contain more than twenty percent additives.

== Production of mineral base oils ==
Mineral base oils are first distilled from petroleum, and they comprise the 26-40 carbon fraction. Aromatic compounds are initially removed by solvent extraction: The distillation cut is mixed with an immiscible solvent such as phenol or furfural. This solvent preferentially dissolves aromatic compounds well, and the aromatic compounds are separated together with the solvent.

Long chain alkanes form waxes that precipitate at relatively high temperature. They are removed either by crystallizing the waxes at low temperature, or they can be isomerized to branched alkanes. Various levels of hydrogenation are used thereafter to remove any remaining aromatic compounds and residual heteroatoms (in the form of nitrogen and sulfur compounds).

Very generally, heteroatoms (as nitrogen and sulfur compounds) and aromatic compounds are removed as the base oil is hydrogenated from Group I through Group III. Reduction in heteroatoms reduces formation of acids when engine oils are exposed to the combustion environment, acids being corrosive to the engine. The reduction in aromatic compounds improves the oxidative stability of the oil, delaying formation of sludge and varnish. Yet both effects lead to the oil becoming less polar, making it a poorer solvent for both the additive package of an engine oil, as well as accumulated oxidation byproducts.

== API classifications ==
In 1993, the American Petroleum Institute (API), categorized base oils into five main groups. Chemical and physical characteristics are defined for Groups I through III that reflect how refined they are, correlating in some way to high and low-temperature viscosity, oxidative stability, volatility, and so on. Group IV oils comprise polyalphaolefins by definition, and Group V oils are those that do not fit into any previous category. The intent of such categorization is to help ensure that engine oils retain performance when different base oils are used. Most passenger car motor oils and automatic transmission fluids that meet OEM requirements are formulated with a combination of Group II, III and IV base oils.

=== Group I ===
Originating in the 1930s, the least refined type which is produced by solvent refining. It usually consists of conventional petroleum base oils. An improvement to the refining process in the 1960s called hydro-treating made this base oil more stable, less reactive, and longer lasting than the earlier base oils.

API defines group I as "base stocks contain less than 90 percent saturates and/or greater than 0.03 percent sulfur and have a viscosity index greater than or equal to 80 and less than 120".

=== Group II ===
Originating in 1971, a better grade of petroleum base oil, which may be partially produced by hydrocracking. All impurities will be removed from the oil leading to clearer color.

API defines group II as "base stocks contain greater than or equal to 90 percent saturates and less than or equal to 0.03 percent sulfur and have a viscosity index greater than or equal to 80 and less than 120".

=== Group III ===
Originating in 1993, the most refined grade of petroleum base oil, since they are fully produced by hydrocracking, hydroisomerization, and hydrotreating, which make these oils purer.

API defines group III as "base stocks contain greater than or equal to 90 percent saturates and less than or equal to 0.03 percent sulfur and have a viscosity index greater than or equal to 120". Chrysler's ATF+4 automatic transmission fluid was developed around a Group III extra-high-viscosity-index (XHVI) base oil from Texaco. Automatic transmission fluid illustrates the trend: when DEXRON-II was introduced in the early 1970s, ATFs could be formulated with conventional solvent-refined Group I base stocks, but the 20,000 cP limit on low-temperature (Brookfield, −40 °C) viscosity in the later DEXRON-IIE and MERCON specifications made Group I difficult to use; MERCON V (1996) needed a blend of Group II and Group IV base stocks, and Chrysler's MS-9602 (1998) required Group III or higher.

=== Group IV ===
Originating in 1974, consists of synthetic oils made of polyalphaolefins (PAO). Group IV base oils have a viscosity index range of 125 - 200.

Polyalphaolefin oils have a higher oxidative stability in extreme temperatures, and also have exceptionally low pour points, which makes them much more suitable for use in very cold weather (as found in northern Europe), as well as in very hot weather (as in Middle East).

=== Group V ===
Originating in the 1940s, any type of base oil other than mentioned in the previously defined groups. Group V oils include alkylated naphthalenes (e.g., ExxonMobil Synesstic) and esters.

== Unofficial classifications ==
Unofficial base oil classifications such as Group II+ and Group III+ are not part of the API classification, which defines only Groups I to V. Individual producers and marketers use these terms for base stocks with a viscosity index at the high end of the official group range, but there is no agreed definition. They are widely used and marketed for motor oils and automatic transmission fluids.

=== Group II+ ===
Originating in the 1990s, a more refined grade of petroleum Group II base oil, produced by hydrotreating. Group II+ base oils have a high viscosity index at the higher end of the API Group II range. The minimum viscosity index is generally put between 110 and 115; most marketers use the term for a viscosity index above 110, though some apply it only at 115 or higher.

=== Group III+ ===
Commonly produced by refining slack wax or gas to liquids (GTL) wax feeds. Group III+ base oils have a very high viscosity index (VHVI) at the higher end of the API Group III range. The minimum viscosity index is generally put between 130 and 140; it is often quoted as above 130, but there is no universal agreement on the criterion.

=== Group VI ===
Consists of synthetic oils made of poly-internal-olefins (PIO).

Poly-internal-olefins (PIO) oils are similar to poly-alpha-olefins (PAO), but use different chemicals in the synthesis process to obtain an even higher viscosity index. (VI)

== See also ==
- Mineral oil, a broader term that encompasses many base oils. This term usually refers to the domestic or medical use of oil refined from petroleum.
