= Noack volatility test =

Test to determine evaporation loss of lubricants in high-temperature service

The Noack volatility test, named after Karl Noack, determines the evaporation loss of lubricants in high-temperature service. This test is standardized as ASTM D5800.

In this test, a sample is heated at 250 °C for 60 minutes with a constant flow of air over it. The weight fraction lost is the result for the Noack volatility test.

As the lighter hydrocarbon fraction of motor oils evaporate, the viscosity of the remaining oil increases, contributing to poor circulation, reduced fuel economy, increased oil consumption, wear and tailpipe emissions.
