= Nicholas Schaeffer =

American industrialist (1814-1880)

- Born: December 4, 1814; Marlem, Alsace, France
- Died: January 3, 1880 (aged 65); St Louis, Missouri
- Occupation: Industrialist

Nicholas Schaeffer (1814-1880) was an American industrialist. He is noted as one of the founders of the American company, Schaeffer Oil. He was also known as one of the largest and most prosperous soap manufacturers in the West during his time.

== Biography ==
Schaeffer was born on December 4, 1814, in Marlem, Alsace, France. His father, who was a shoemaker, died when Schaeffer was only two years old, leaving his mother to raise him and six other children. Four of Schaeffer's siblings, who were all boys, died. The family was described as well enough so that Schaeffer received basic education. At age 14, he left school to work for a manufacturer of soap and candles in Strasbourg. After a year, he left this apprenticeship and went back home. There he stayed until 1832 when his mother and his three other brothers moved to the United States.

In 1832, they reached Baltimore, Maryland, where they purchased a horse and a wagon and set out for Cincinnati, Ohio. Along the way, their horse was stolen and the family was forced to sell their wagon and harness. They were able to secure a ride for their mother in a freight wagon and Schaeffer and his brothers walked to Wheeling, West Virginia. This is where they obtained passage in a flatboat to Cincinnati. Schaeffer took in odd jobs including works for a tannery and a quarry. He also became a steward in a hotel before relocating to Saint Louis in 1839. It was in this city where Schaeffer established the beginnings of his candle and soap empire, which was established as Schaeffer Manufacturing Co. in the same year.

Later, Schaeffer's company started manufacturing oils and greases as demand for these products increased during the California Gold Rush. The lubricants were produced from animal fats, which were also the main ingredient for Schaeffer's soaps and candles. The company expanded to the manufacture of engine oil for steamships and grease for Conestoga wagons. Noted products include the Black Beauty Grease for covered wagons and Red Engine Oil, which was a lubricant for steamboats.

Schaeffer built two soap manufacturing facilities in Saint Louis. One of these was consumed by a fire in 1849. His remaining business was then merged with those owned by Eberhard Anheuser, who was his best friend. When the latter suggested the company expand to the brewery business by buying out Bavarian Brewery, Schaeffer asked to be bought out and continued on in the manufacture of soap and lubricants. By 1859, Schaeffer's company was already posting over $1 million revenues annually and its operations already covered the entire United States.

Schaeffer's company suffered during the 1870s panic but it survived. Schaeffer died in 1880 and his business was inherited by his son, Jacob who went on to establish the Schaeffer Bros. & Powell Manufacturing Co.
