= Mini-rotary viscometer =

Type of viscosity meter

The mini-rotary viscometer is a device used to measure the pumpability of an engine oil at low temperatures. Engine oils must meet viscometric standards including those determined by the MRV in order to be classifiable within SAE J300 viscosity grades. The requirement was added after the winters of 1980-81 and 1981-82 caused major pumpability field problems in the US and Europe.

Different MRV test procedure exist; for example ASTM D4684, required for SAE J300, involves heating the oil to remove its "memory" then cooling it at a controlled rate over a period of more than 40 hours to the test temperature. ASTM D4684 is done with fresh oil, so the MRV result may not be representative of used oil pumpability. Some motor vehicles manufacturers specify used oil MRV requirements.
