= Synthetic oil =

Lubricant consisting of artificially made chemical compounds

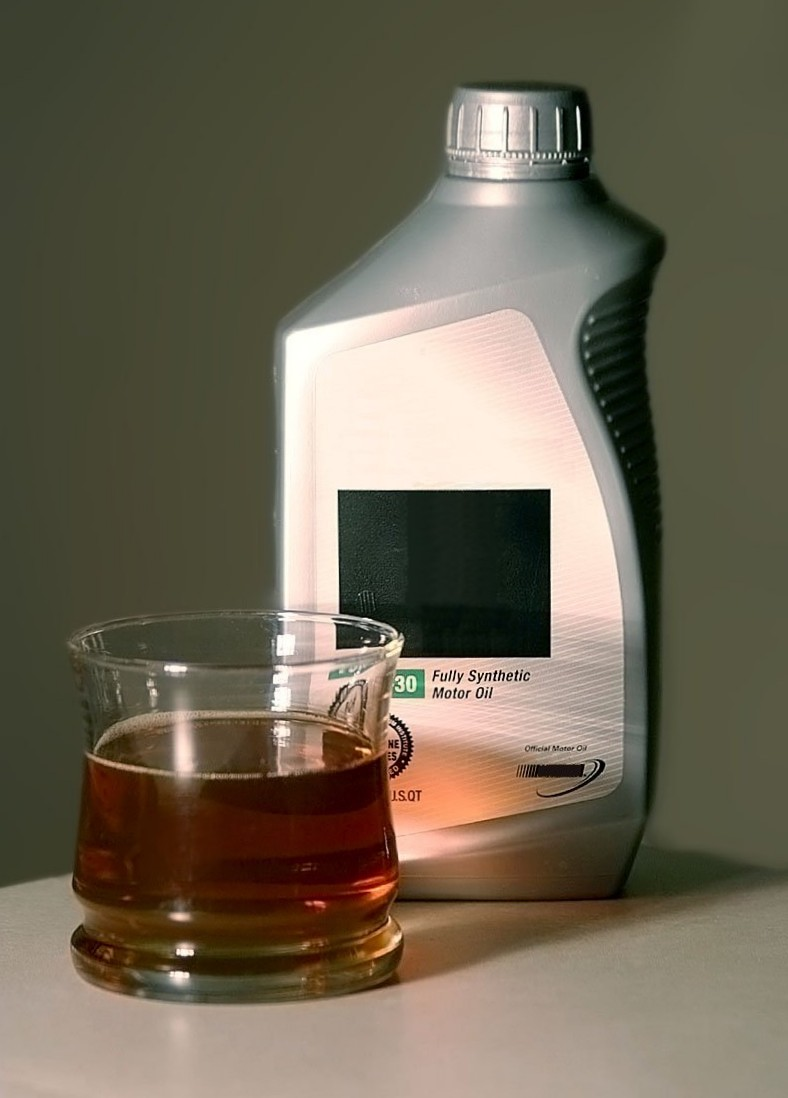
A sample of synthetic motor oil

Synthetic oil is a lubricant consisting of chemical compounds that are artificially modified or synthesised. Synthetic oil is used as a substitute for petroleum-refined oils when operating in extreme temperature, in metal stamping to provide environmental and other benefits, and to lubricate pendulum clocks. There are various types of synthetic oils. Advantages of using synthetic motor oils include better low-and high-temperature viscosity performance, better (higher) viscosity index (VI), and chemical and shear stability, while disadvantages are that synthetics are substantially more expensive (per volume) than mineral oils and have potential decomposition problems.

== Description ==
Synthetic oil lubricant comprises chemical compounds that are artificially modified or synthesised. Synthetic lubricants can be manufactured using chemically modified petroleum components rather than whole crude oil, but can also be synthesized from other raw materials. The base material, however, is still overwhelmingly crude oil that is distilled and then modified physically and chemically. The actual synthesis process and composition of additives is generally a commercial trade secret and will vary among producers.

== Use ==
- Synthetic oil is used as a substitute for petroleum-refined oils when operating in extreme temperature. Aircraft jet engines, for example, require the use of synthetic oils, whereas aircraft piston engines do not.
- Synthetic oils are also used in metal stamping to provide environmental and other benefits when compared to conventional petroleum and animal-fat based products. These products are also referred to as "non-oil" or "oil free".
- A polyalcanoate synthetic oil is widely used to lubricate pendulum clocks.

== Types ==
=== Full ===
Some synthetic oils are made from Group III base stock and some from Group IV, while other synthetic oils may be a blend of the two. Mobil sued Castrol and Castrol prevailed in showing that their Group III base stock oil was changed enough that it qualified as full synthetic. Since then American Petroleum Institute (API) has removed all references to synthetic in their documentation regarding standards. "Full synthetic" is a marketing term and is not a measurable quality.

==== Group IV: PAO ====
Poly-alpha-olefin (poly-α-olefin, PAO) is a non-polar polymer made by polymerizing an alpha-olefin. It is designated as API Group IV and is a 100% synthetic chemical compound. It is a specific type of olefin (organic) that is used as a base stock in the production of most synthetic lubricants. An alpha-olefin (or α-olefin) is an alkene where the carbon-carbon double bond starts at the α-carbon atom, i.e. the double bond is between the #1 and #2 carbons in the molecule.

==== Group V: Other synthetics ====
Group V base oils are defined by API as any other type of oil other than mineral oils or PAO lubricants.

Esters are the most famous synthetics in Group V, which are 100% synthetic chemical compounds consisting of a carbonyl adjacent to an ether linkage. They are derived by reacting an oxoacid with a hydroxyl compound such as an alcohol or phenol. Esters are usually derived from an inorganic acid or organic acid in which at least one -OH (hydroxyl) group is replaced by an -O-alkyl (alkoxy) group, most commonly from carboxylic acids and alcohols. That is to say, esters are formed by condensing of an acid with an alcohol.

Many chemically different "esters"—due to their polarity and usually excellent lubricity—are used for various reasons as either "additives" or "base stocks" for lubricants.

===== Polyalkylene glycol (PAG) synthetic oil =====
====== Industrial PAG ======
- The terms polyalkylene glycol and polyglycol are used interchangeably.
- Synthetic lubricants are about 4% of the lubricants market. PAGs are about 24% of the synthetic lubricants market.
- Ethylene is the basic raw material used to make the synthetic lubricant polyglycols oils. When ethylene and propylene react with oxygen we obtain ethylene oxide (EO) and propylene oxide (PO), from which the polyalkylene glycols are produced by means of polymerization. Polyalkylene glycols are usually made by combination of ethylene oxide and/or propylene oxide with an alcohol or water.
- The mixing ratio between EO and PO, plus the oxygen bonded in the chemical structure, crucially affect the behavior of polyglycols. The gear industry predominantly uses polyglycols with an EO/PO ratio of 50:50 to 60:40, which exhibit very similar behavior. The polyglycols featuring this composition are also generally referred to as water-soluble polyglycols.
- Polyalkylene glycol base oils are formed by reacting an alcohol with one or more alkylene oxides: Propylene oxide provides water insolubility, Ethylene oxide provides water solubility.

====== PAG properties ======
PAGs offer high lubricity, polarity, low traction properties, high viscosity index, controlled quenching speeds, good temperature stability and low wear. They are available in both water-soluble and -insoluble forms.

====== PAG uses ======
PAGs are commonly used in quenching fluids, metalworking fluids, gear oils, chain oils, food-grade lubricants and as lubricants in HFC type hydraulics and gas compressor equipment. PAG lubricants are used by the two largest U.S. air compressor OEMs in rotary screw air compressors. PAG oils of different viscosity grades (usually either ISO VG 46 or ISO VG 100) are often used as compressor lubricants for automotive air conditioning systems employing low global warming potential refrigerants.

====== PAG advantages ======
- PAGs are available in a wide range of viscosity grades and additive packages for a variety of uses. Some PAGs properties such as water solubility are not commonly provided by other synthetic lubricants, such as polyalphaolefins (PAO).
- PAGs prevent sludge and varnish from developing at high temperatures. PAGs have viscosity indexes that are higher than PAOs.
- In large gears, PAG lubricant yielded lower friction than PAO lubricant.
- PAG oils are polar, which means that an oil film easily develops upon all moving metal parts, reducing startup wear.
- PAGs can be highly biodegradable, particularly the water-soluble PAGs.
- PAGs perform better than in extreme weather condition.

====== PAG disadvantages ======
- PAGs are not compatible with mineral oils, most seals, paints, varnishes.
- Synthetic oil is more expensive than mineral oils.

====== PAG seal compatibility ======
- PAG is usually compatible with fluorocarbon-based fluoroelastomer materials and vinyl methyl silicone (VMQ) silicone rubber.
- PAG acts as a solvent and dissolves and removes the mineral grease which causes slower motions, air leaks, and can stop 4-way valves from operating.
- Natural rubber, Buna-N, and most regular seals are incompatible with PAG oils, especially seals coated in mineral grease. PAG oils can cause seals to shrink or swell, thus causing severe leakage or seizure of the seal. Pneumatic air cylinders and 4-ways valves commonly use Buna-N rubber seals that are coated in mineral grease.

=== Semi-synthetic oil ===
Semi-synthetic oils (also called "synthetic blends") are a mixture of mineral oil and synthetic oil, which are engineered to have many of the benefits of full synthetic oil without the cost. Motul introduced the first semi-synthetic motor oil in 1966.

Lubricants that have synthetic base stocks even lower than 30% but with high-performance additives consisting of esters can also be considered synthetic lubricants. In general, the ratio of the synthetic base stock is used to define commodity codes among the customs declarations for tax purposes.

=== Other base stocks help semi-synthetic lubricants ===
API Group II- and API Group III-type base stocks help to formulate more economic-type semi-synthetic lubricants. API Group I-, II-, II+-, and III-type mineral-base oil stocks are widely used in combination with additive packages, performance packages, and ester and/or API Group IV poly-alpha-olefins in order to formulate semi-synthetic-based lubricants. API Group III base oils are sometimes considered fully synthetic, but they are still classified as highest-top-level mineral-base stocks. Chemically, a synthetic or synthesized material is one produced by the combining or building of individual units into a unified entity. Synthetic base stocks as described above are man-made and tailored to have a controlled molecular structure with predictable properties, unlike mineral base oils, which are complex mixtures of naturally occurring hydrocarbons and paraffins.

== Performance of synthetic oil ==
The advantages of using synthetic motor oils include better low-and high-temperature viscosity performance at service temperature extremes, better (higher) Viscosity Index (VI), and chemical and shear stability. This also helps in decreasing the loss due to evaporation. It is resistant to oxidation, thermal breakdown, oil sludge problems and provides extended drain intervals, with the environmental benefit of less used oil waste generated. It provides better lubrication in extreme cold conditions. The use of synthetic oils promises a longer engine life with superior protection against "ash" and other deposit formation in engine hot spots (in particular in turbochargers and superchargers) for less oil burn-off and reduced chances of damaging oil passageway clogging. The performance of automobiles is improved as net increase in horsepower and torque due to less internal drag on engine. Moreover, it can improve fuel efficiency - 1.8% to 5% as has been documented in fleet tests.

However, synthetic motor oils are substantially more expensive (per volume) than mineral oils and have potential decomposition problems in certain chemical environments (predominantly in industrial use).

== See also ==
- PTT Public Company Limited
- TotalEnergies
- Amsoil
- Castrol
- ENEOS
- ENOC
- Fischer–Tropsch process
- Idemitsu Kosan
- Liqui Moly
- Mobil 1
- Valvoline
- Shell
- Fuchs Petrolub
- Motul
- Pennzoil
- Petro-Canada
- Quaker State
- Red Line Oil
- Royal Purple
- Schaeffer Oil
- Silver State
- Synthetic fuel
