= Alkylated naphthalene =

Alkylated naphthalenes are chemical compounds made by the alkylation of naphthalene or its derivatives with an olefin. These compounds are used as synthetic base oils, and are claimed to have improved oxidative stability over some conventional base oils. Having an aromatic core, alkylated naphthalenes are better at solvating polar compounds than alkane mineral oils and polyalphaolefins.

In the context of lubrication, alkylated naphthalenes are considered Group V base oils by the American Petroleum Institute. For 2020, demand for this class of base oil (that includes other types of Group V base oils) was estimated at 823,000 tonnes per year. Commercial examples of alkylated naphthalene oils include ExxonMobil's Synesstic series and King Industries' NA-LUBE KR series.
