= Schaeffer Oil =

US oil company

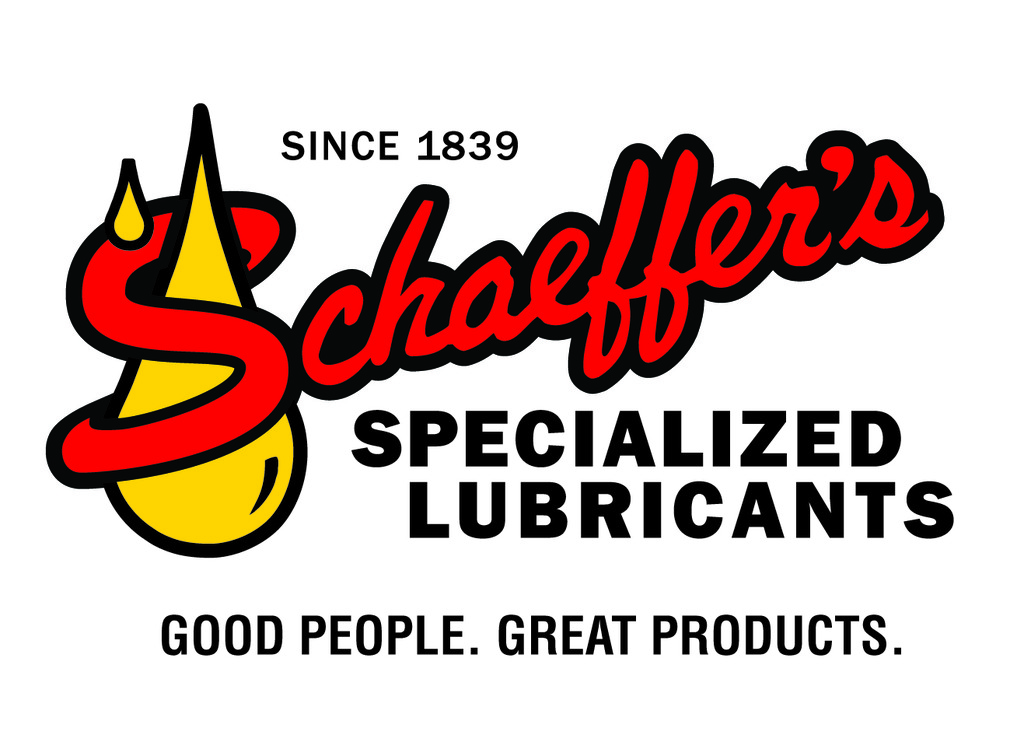
- Company type: Private
- Industry: Oil company
- Founded: 1839
- Headquarters: St. Louis, Missouri, US

Schaeffer Oil is a privately held, U.S. company, which operates under the name Schaeffer Manufacturing Company. Schaeffer manufactures specialty lubrication products, including oil additives, friction modifiers, and synthetic oils, greases and other compounds. Its products are marketed directly by the company to end users in industries including construction, mining, agriculture, manufacturing, trucking, marine, and high performance racing. As of 2017, the company had domestic and international sales in excess of $150 million.

== History ==
Schaeffer Manufacturing Company was founded in 1839 by a German immigrant, Nicholas Schaeffer, in St. Louis, Missouri, under the name Nicholas Schaeffer and Company. Originally producing soaps and candles, the company began manufacturing oils and greases to support the westward expansion during the 1849 California Gold Rush. Pioneers traveling west from St. Louis used Schaeffer soap and candles for domestic use products as well as for grease for wagon wheels. As St. Louis established itself as a major Mississippi port and industrial city, Schaeffer manufactured products expressly for the high large number of wagon trains and steamboats that made their way through the city. The company's original line of lubricants was sold under the trade names Red Engine Oil and its original line of grease was called Black Beauty grease. By 1862, Schaeffer produced over $1M in annual sales. Miners in the Klondike gold rush later in the century reportedly smeared Black Beauty grease on their faces to ward off frostbite.

Founder Nicholas Schaeffer was a contemporary of another successful St. Louis business owner, Eberhard Anheuser, who also was a fellow soap-maker. Along with Anheuser, Schaeffer was a creditor of the Bavarian Brewery Company, a struggling brewery founded in 1853. When the brewery encountered financial difficulty in 1860, Schaeffer and Anheuser purchased the minor creditors' interests and took over the company, renaming it as Schaeffer, Anheuser & Co. Two years later, Anheuser bought out Schaeffer's interest in what later became the Anheuser-Busch Company. Nicholas Schaeffer and Company continued to grow and was widely successful, eventually placing its owner as one of St. Louis’ first millionaires. Nicholas Schaeffer led the company until his death in 1880.

In 1879, Jacob Schaeffer became president of the company and changed the name to Schaeffer Brothers and Powell. The company became the largest soap and candle maker west of the Mississippi, producing Boss laundry bar soaps, crude glycerin, various grades of lard oil and Coach and Star brand candles. Schaeffer's Star Candles were discovered in the wreck of the steamboat Bertrand, which sank in the Missouri River in 1865.

During the 1904 World's Fair, Schaeffer Brothers and Powell participated as sponsors.

William Shields, became president of the company, when his father-in-law, Jacob Schaeffer, died in 1917. Shields remained president until his oldest son, Tom Shields, succeeded him in 1946.

In 1947, the company initiated a number of new products and remodeled their business structure into a direct selling format. The name of the Company was changed to Schaeffer Manufacturing Company and in 1950, the company closed its soap and candle-making businesses to dedicate its resources to lubricant manufacturing. During this period, Schaeffer began building a direct sales force under the leadership of sales manager Martin J. Schwab. After the death of Tom Shields and Martin Schwab in 1982, John Schaeffer Shields became Chairman of the Board and continued to oversee the company's leadership until his death in December 2016.

It was also during this period that grease and oil blenders at Schaeffer began to experiment with the use of molybdenum disulfide as an extreme pressure lubricant. Schaeffer was recognized for its use of molybdenum as a friction modifier in the 1986 publication of Lubes n Greases Magazine.

In 1986, Tom Hermann, the son of Jackie (Shields) Hermann, became the president of the company. At that time, annual sales were $18M, primarily in the agriculture and mining markets. Hermann expanded the markets to include steel manufacturing, food processing and industrial customers. In 2004, Jay Schaeffer Shields became the president of the company.

Today, Schaeffer Manufacturing Company is the oldest oil and grease manufacturer in the United States. The company was included in the Inc. 5000 list of the fastest-growing private companies.

== Products ==
Schaeffer has developed energy conserving lubricants, as well as products that are designed for extended use, aiming to reduce negative impact on the environment and cut disposal costs. Schaeffer manufactures several fuel additives that are soy-based, including Soy Ultra and Soy Shield. Additionally, it offers products that aim to reduce the amount of water needed to grow crops in drought-prone areas, named Wet-Sol and Wet-Sol Gro. Schaeffer's proprietary additives, Micron Moly and Penetro, are claimed by the company to reduce temperatures and help extend lubricant life, reducing energy up to 5%. Schaeffer also produces SchaefferSeal Tire Sealant, which seals tires to help keep them inflated for maximum fuel economy, and a bed release agent that is biodegradable. The company was the first major lubricant supplier to the global mining industry to introduce solvent free technology for open gear compounds.

Schaeffer manufactures biodegradable lubricants and cleaners, designed to dissipate rapidly when spilled into environmentally-sensitive areas.

In 1991, Schaeffer donated lubricants specially designed for high contamination environments to the U.S. military for use in Operation Desert Storm and Operation Desert Shield. Following the Gulf War, Schaeffer was awarded a commendation from U.S. President George H. W. Bush and Secretary of Defense Dick Cheney for “support of the troops.” In 2005, the company established a General Services Administration (GSA) contract with the U.S. Federal government to supply products to federal facilities, including post offices, prisons, federal law enforcement, national parks and the U.S. military.

Schaeffer products are primarily marketed directly to end users by their factory direct sales force. The company limits retailers, distributors and resellers to focus on bulk and commercial business. Consumer and automotive business is not a primary focus of the marketing effort of the company. Schaeffer provides oil for the automobile racing industry, and offers a line of oils that are designed specifically for racing. Automobile racers including Charles “Red” Farmer, Scott Bloomquist, Gregg Dalman of Dalman Racing, & Jared Andretti Racing use Schaeffer.

== Company structure ==
Schaeffer markets its products through factory trained, independent representatives that sell in particular areas around the United States and Canada. The domestic sales force is divided into 15 divisions supported by 12 warehouses that ship to end users. Sales representatives are paid on commission. Schaeffer has 53 Certified Lubrication Specialists (CLS). The Society of Tribologists and Lubrication Engineers certifies members of the technical society as “certified” once they have passed an examination. There are fewer than 1,000 CLS worldwide.

International sales are directed through independent distributors, who are trained and supported by the company. Several of Schaeffer's international distributors also hold the CLS designation, including distributors in New Zealand and Mexico.

All manufacturing is done at the St. Louis facility.
