= Viscosity index =

Measure of a fluid's viscosity

The viscosity index (VI) is an arbitrary, unit-less measure of a fluid's change in viscosity relative to temperature change. It is mostly used to characterize the viscosity-temperature behavior of lubricating oils. The lower the VI, the more the viscosity is affected by changes in temperature. The higher the VI, the more stable the viscosity remains over some temperature range. The VI was originally measured on a scale from 0 to 100; however, advancements in lubrication science have led to the development of oils with much higher VIs.

The viscosity of a lubricant is closely related to its ability to reduce friction in solid body contacts. Generally, the least viscous lubricant which still forces the two moving surfaces apart to achieve "fluid bearing" conditions is desired in a normal working condition of an engine or equipment/implement. If the lubricant is too viscous, it will require a large amount of energy to move (as in honey); if it is too thin, the surfaces will come in contact and friction will increase.

== Relevance ==
Many lubricant applications require the lubricant to perform across a wide range of conditions, for example, automotive lubricants are required to reduce friction between engine components when the engine is started from cold (relative to the engine's operating temperatures) up to 200 °C (392 °F) when it is running. The best oils with the highest VI will remain stable and not vary much in viscosity over the temperature range. This provides consistent engine performance within the normal working conditions. Historically, there were two different oil types recommended for usage in different weather conditions. As an example, with winter oils and cold starting the engines, and with temperature ranges from, say, −30 °C to 0 °C, a 5 weight oil would be pumpable at the very low temperatures and the generally cooler engine operating temperatures. However, in hot climates, where temperatures range from 30 °C to 45 °C, a 50 weight oil would be necessary, so it would remain thick enough to hold up an oil film between the moving hot parts.

Thus the issue of multigrade oils came into being, where with variable temperatures of, say, −10 °C during the cold nights and 20 °C during the days, a 5 weight oil would be good as the oil would be pumpable in a cold engine and as the engine came up to running temperature, and the day warmed up, the characteristics of a 30 weight oil would be ideal. Thus the 5W-30 oils were introduced, rather than the fixed and temperature limiting grades – where the thin oils became too thin when hot and the thicker oils became too thick when cold.

The effects of temperature on a single-viscosity oil can be demonstrated by pouring a small amount of vegetable oil into a pot or pan and then either cooling it in a freezer or heating it on a cooking stove. When oils get cold enough in a deep freezer, they will solidify into a block of "wax"-like oil that cannot be pumped around inside an engine's lubrication system. However, when a spoonful of very cold oil is put into a pan on a stove and it is slowly heated and swirled around, the oil will gradually warm up, and there is a definite temperature range where the oil is warm and traditionally "oily". However, as the oil is heated further, the oil becomes thinner and thinner, until it is nearly smoking and is almost as thin as water – and thus it has almost no capacity to keep moving parts separated, resulting in metal-to-metal contact and damage of the components that are supposed to be kept apart with a thin film of oil.

Thus the multigrade oils are recommended for use based on the ambient temperature ranges of the season or environment.

Additionally, there are the issues of oil temperature maintenance, such as oil or engine heaters that enable easy starting and shorter warm-up period in very cold climates, and oil coolers to dump enough heat from the oil, and thus the engine, gearbox, or hydraulic oil circuit, so as to keep the oil's upper temperature to within a specified upper working limit.

== Classification ==
The VI scale was set up by the Society of Automotive Engineers (SAE). The temperatures chosen arbitrarily for reference are 100 and 210 °F (38 and 99 °C). The scale was originally interpolated between 0 for a naphthenic Texas Gulf crude and 100 for a paraffinic Pennsylvania crude. Since the inception of the scale, better oils have also been produced, leading to VIs greater than 100 (see below).

VI improving additives and higher-quality base oils are widely used nowadays, which increase the VIs attainable beyond the value of 100. The viscosity index of synthetic oils ranges from 80 to over 400.

Viscosity index	Classification
Under 35	Low
35 to 80	Medium
80 to 110	High
Above 110	Very high

== Calculation ==
The viscosity index can be calculated using the following formula:

$$\text{VI} = \begin{cases}
100 \dfrac{L - U}{L - H} & \text{if VI} \le 100, \\
100 + \dfrac{\exp\left(\frac{\log H - \log U}{\log Y}\right) - 1}{0.00715}  & \text{if VI} > 100,
\end{cases}$$

where U is the oil's kinematic viscosity at 40 °C (104 °F), Y is the oil's kinematic viscosity at 100 °C (212 °F), and L and H are the viscosities at 40 °C for two hypothetical oils of VI 0 and 100 respectively, having the same viscosity at 100 °C as the oil whose VI we are trying to determine. That is, the two oils with viscosity Y at 100 °C and a VI of 0 and 100 would have at 40 °C the viscosities of L and H respectively. These L and H values can be found in tables in ASTM D2270 and are incorporated in online calculators.
