= Oil additive =

Chemicals that improve oil performance

Oil additives are chemical compounds that improve the lubricant performance of base oil (or oil "base stock"). The manufacturer of many oils can use the same base stock for each formulation and can choose different additives for each use. Additives comprise up to 5% by weight of some oils.

Nearly all commercial motor oils contain additives, whether the oils are synthetic or petroleum based. Essentially, only the American Petroleum Institute (API) Service SA motor oils have no additives, and they are therefore incapable of protecting modern engines. The choice of additives is determined by the use, e.g. the oil for a diesel engine with direct injection in a pickup truck (API Service CJ-4) has different additives than the oil used in a small gasoline-powered outboard motor on a boat (2-cycle engine oil).

== Types of additives ==
Oil additives are vital for the proper lubrication and prolonged use of motor oil in modern internal combustion engines. Without many of these, the oil would become contaminated, break down, leak out, or not properly protect engine parts at all operating temperatures. Just as important are additives for oils used inside gearboxes, automatic transmissions, and bearings. Some of the most important additives include those used for viscosity and lubricity, contaminant control, for the control of chemical breakdown, and for seal conditioning. Some additives permit lubricants to perform better under severe conditions, such as extreme pressures and temperatures and high levels of contamination.

=== Controlling chemical breakdown ===
- Detergent additives, dating back to the early 1930s, are used to clean and neutralize oil impurities which would normally cause deposits (oil sludge) on vital engine parts. Typical detergents are magnesium sulfonates.
- Corrosion or rust inhibiting additives retard the oxidation of metals inside an engine.
- Antioxidant additives retard the degradation of the oil stock by oxidation. Typical additives are organic amines and phenols.
- Metal deactivators create a film on metal surfaces to prevent the metal from causing the oil to be oxidized.
- Bases may be used to combat chemical decomposition of the base stock oil in the presence of acids. When oil is subjected to shear wear and oxidation by air and combustion gases, it will have a tendency to collect acids and increase its Total Acid Number (TAN). For example, the breakdown acids found in used gear oil may include carbocyclic acids, ketones, esters and nitration and sulfation byproducts. Organic and inorganic bases and detergents are included in most formulated oils, as discussed in the following paragraph, so some (but not all) of these contaminants will be neutralized. Gear oil degradation and longevity can be measured by its TAN.

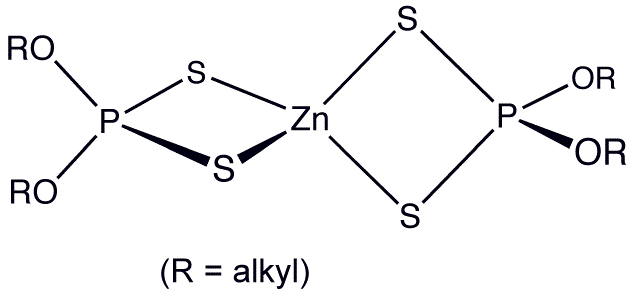
Idealized structure of a zinc dithiophosphate, a typical antiwear agent found in many motor oils.

- Alkaline additives are used to neutralize the acids mentioned previously, and also help prevent the formation of sulfates in a working oil. A formulated oil will often have KOH (potassium hydroxide), a strong base, in small amounts, as it is an effective neutralizer used in refining petroleum. Additives that perform a similar function in a motor oil include magnesium and calcium sulphonates, salicylates, and phenates. These are the detergent additives mentioned previously. To measure the alkalinity potential of a formulated oil, it is tested to obtain the equivalent amount of KOH to arrive at the oil's Total Base Number (TBN) with units of mg of KOH per gram of oil. As the additive package degrades, TBN will decrease until the motor oil needs to be replaced. Further use of the oil will permit sludge, varnish, and metal corrosion. An important measurement of a motor oil's degradation and longevity is its TBN relative to a new oil.

=== For viscosity ===
- Viscosity modifiers make an oil's viscosity higher at elevated temperatures, improving its viscosity index (VI). This combats the tendency of the oil to become thin at high temperature. The advantage of using less viscous oil with a VI improver is that it will have improved low temperature fluidity as well as being viscous enough to lubricate at operating temperature. Most multi-grade oils have viscosity modifiers. Some synthetic oils are engineered to meet multi-grade specifications without them. Viscosity modifiers are often plastic polymers. Virtually all oils require a specific range of viscosity as a working fluid, so viscosity is the primary factor that determines if an oil is acceptable for the engine. As oils degrade from use, their viscosity will decrease, eventually requiring their replacement.
- Pour point depressants improve the oil's ability to flow at lower temperatures.

=== For lubricity ===
- Friction modifiers or friction reducers, like molybdenum disulfide ("moly"), are used for increasing engine fuel economy by reducing friction between moving parts. Friction modifiers alter the lubricity of the base oil. Whale oil was used historically. In it is shown how use of anti-friction additives can increase the power efficiency of a motor.

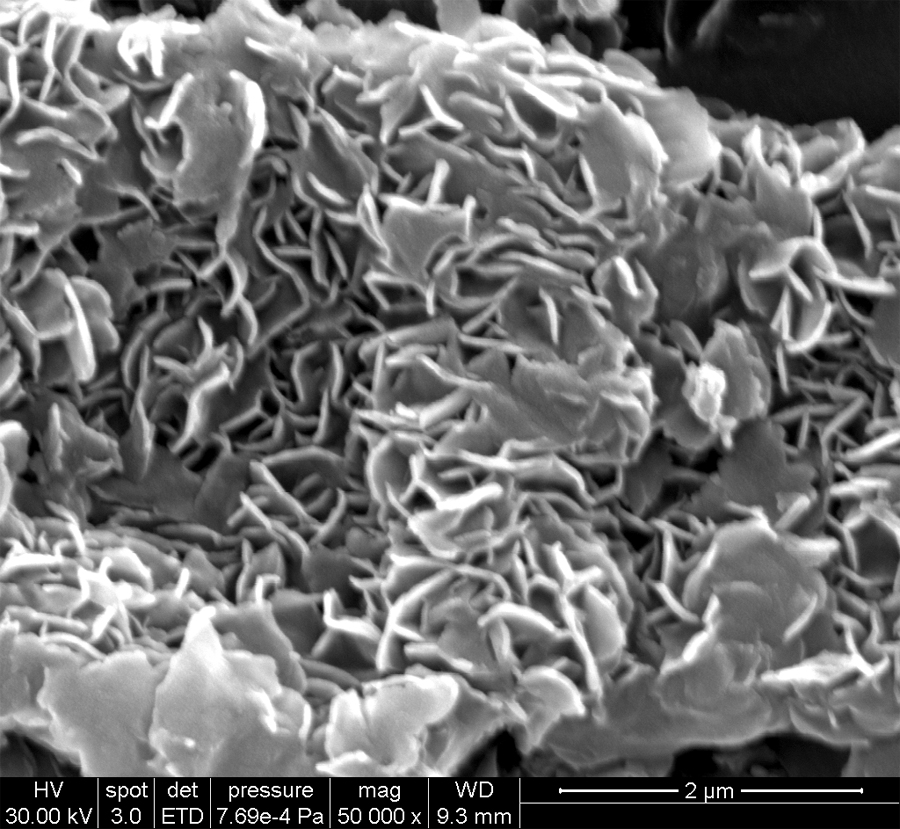
Nanoparticle flakes from the oil additive TriboTEX. Image taken with electron microscope showing the nano scale.

- Extreme pressure agents bond to metal surfaces, keeping them from touching even at high pressure.
- Antiwear or wear-inhibiting additives cause a film to surround metal parts, helping to keep them separated. Inexpensive zinc dialkyldithiophosphate or zinc dithiophosphates are common, although zinc use is declining in modern engine oil.
- Nanoparticles that build diamond-like carbon coatings, which improve embeddability and can achieve superlubricity. The technology is developed with Argonne National Laboratory and Pacific Northwest National Laboratory and the foundation of TriboTEX product. The ability of this technology to reduce and even repair wear was described in NASA Spinoff Magazine.
- Inorganic Fullerene-like Tungsten Disulfide (IF-WS2) nanoparticles with a hollow sphere (Fullerene-like) morphology, provide extreme lubricity, anti-friction and high impact resistance (up to 35 GPa). The IF-WS2 particles were discovered by Professor Reshef Tenne at the Weizmann Institute of Science. Unlike standard lubricant additives that have platelet-like structures with moderate tribological properties, IF-WS2 particles have tens of caged concentric layers, making these particles excel under extreme pressure or load. The IF-LWS2 particles are available in dry powder form as well as a dispersion in oil, water, and solvent. These dispersions are used in the formulation of various lubricants, grease, metalworking fluids, coatings, paints, and polymers.

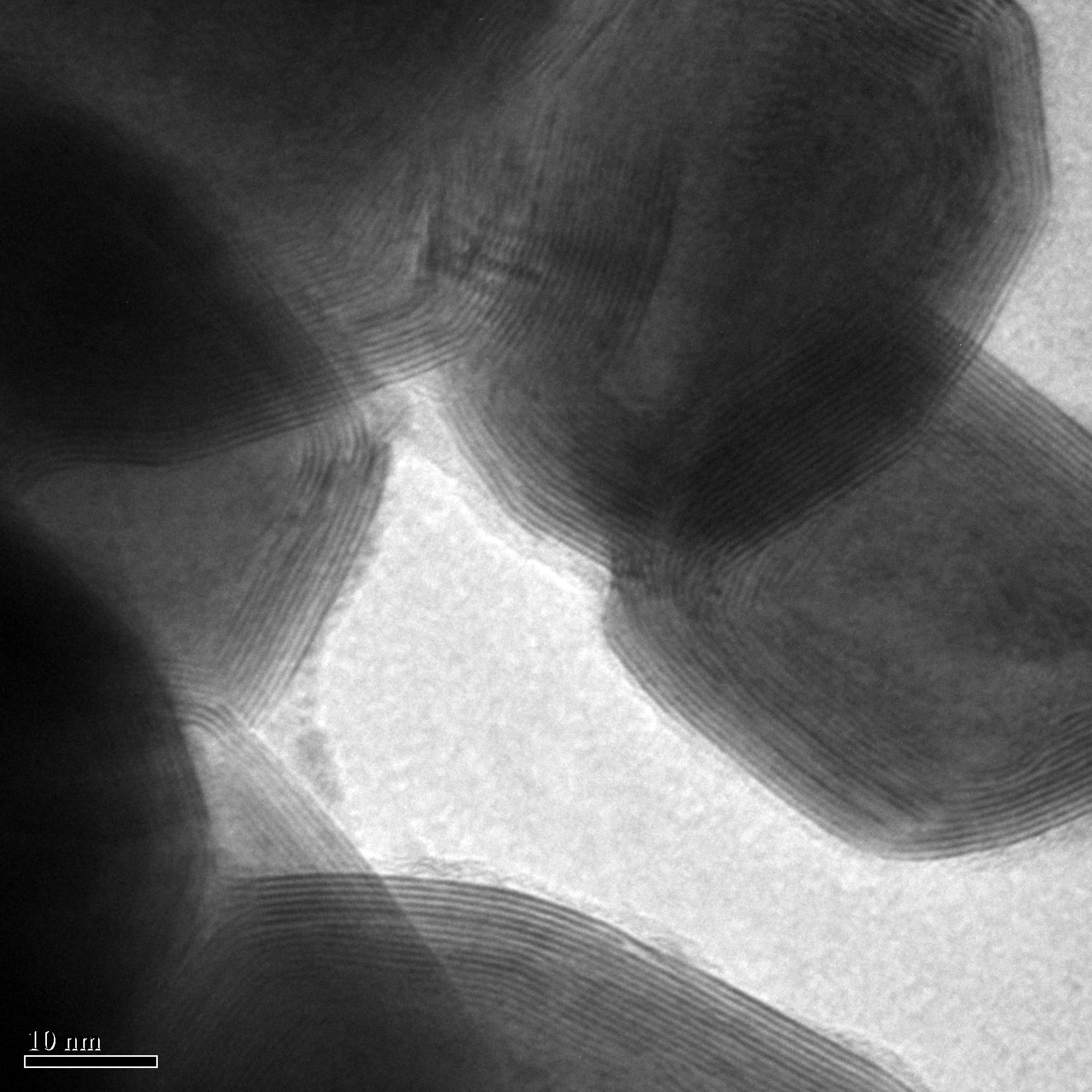
TEM image of a group of scientific-grade nanoparticles manufactured by Nanotech Industrial Solutions. Note the near-spherical shape and presence of a hollow core.

=== For contaminant control ===
- Metal particles released by wear are unintentional and undesirable oil additives. Most large metal particles and impurities are removed in situ using either magnets or oil filters.
- Dispersants keep contaminants (e.g. soot) suspended in the oil to prevent them from coagulating.
- Anti-foam agents (defoamants) inhibit the production of air bubbles and foam in the oil which can cause a loss of lubrication, pitting, and corrosion where entrained air and combustion gases contact metal surfaces.
- Antimisting agents prevent the atomization of the oil. Typical antimisting agents are silicones.
- Wax crystal modifiers are dewaxing aids that improve the ability of oil filters to separate wax from oil. This type of additive has applications in the refining and transport of oil, but not for lubricant formulation.

=== For other reasons ===
- Seal conditioners cause gaskets and seals to swell to reduce oil leakage. These are generally found in "high mileage" engine oils.

== Additives in the aftermarket and controversy ==
Motor oil is manufactured with numerous additives, and there are also aftermarket additives. A glaring inconsistency of mass-marketed aftermarket oil additives is that they often use additives which are foreign to motor oil. On the other hand, commercial additives are also sold that are designed for extended drain intervals (to replace depleted additives in used oil) or for formulating oils in situ (to make a custom motor oil from base stock). Commercial additives are identical to the additives found in off-the-shelf motor oil, while mass-marketed additives have some of each.

Although PTFE, a solid, was used in some aftermarket oil additives, some users said that the PTFE clumped together, clogging filters. Certain people in the 1990s reported that this was corroborated by NASA and U.S. universities. However, if the PTFE particles are smaller than those apparently used in the 1980s and 1990s, then PTFE can be an effective lubricant in suspension. The size of the particle and many other interrelated components of a lubricant make it difficult to make blanket statements about whether PTFE is useful or harmful. Although PTFE has been called "the slickest substance known to man", it would hardly do any good if it remains in the oil filter.

Some mass-market engine oil additives, notably the ones containing PTFE/Teflon (e.g. Slick 50) and chlorinated paraffins (e.g. Dura Lube), caused a major backlash by consumers; the U.S. Federal Trade Commission investigated many mass-marketed engine oil additives in the late 1990s. Although there is no reason to say that all oil additives used in packaged engine oil are good and all aftermarket oil additives are bad, there has been a tendency in the aftermarket industry to make unfounded claims regarding the efficacy of their oil additives. These unsubstantiated claims have caused consumers to be lured into adding a bottle of chemicals to their engines which do not lower emissions, improve wear resistance, lower temperatures, improve efficiency, or extend engine life more than the (much cheaper) oil would have. Many consumers are convinced that aftermarket oil additives work, but many consumers are convinced that they do not work and are in fact detrimental to the engine. The topic is hotly debated on the Internet.

== See also ==
- Fuel additive
- Gasoline additive
- Oil analysis – Laboratory analysis of an oil based lubricant's properties and contaminants
- Tribology, the science of friction, lubrication and wear
