= Glossary of entomology terms =

Parts of an adult butterfly

This glossary of entomology describes terms used in the formal study of insect species by entomologists.

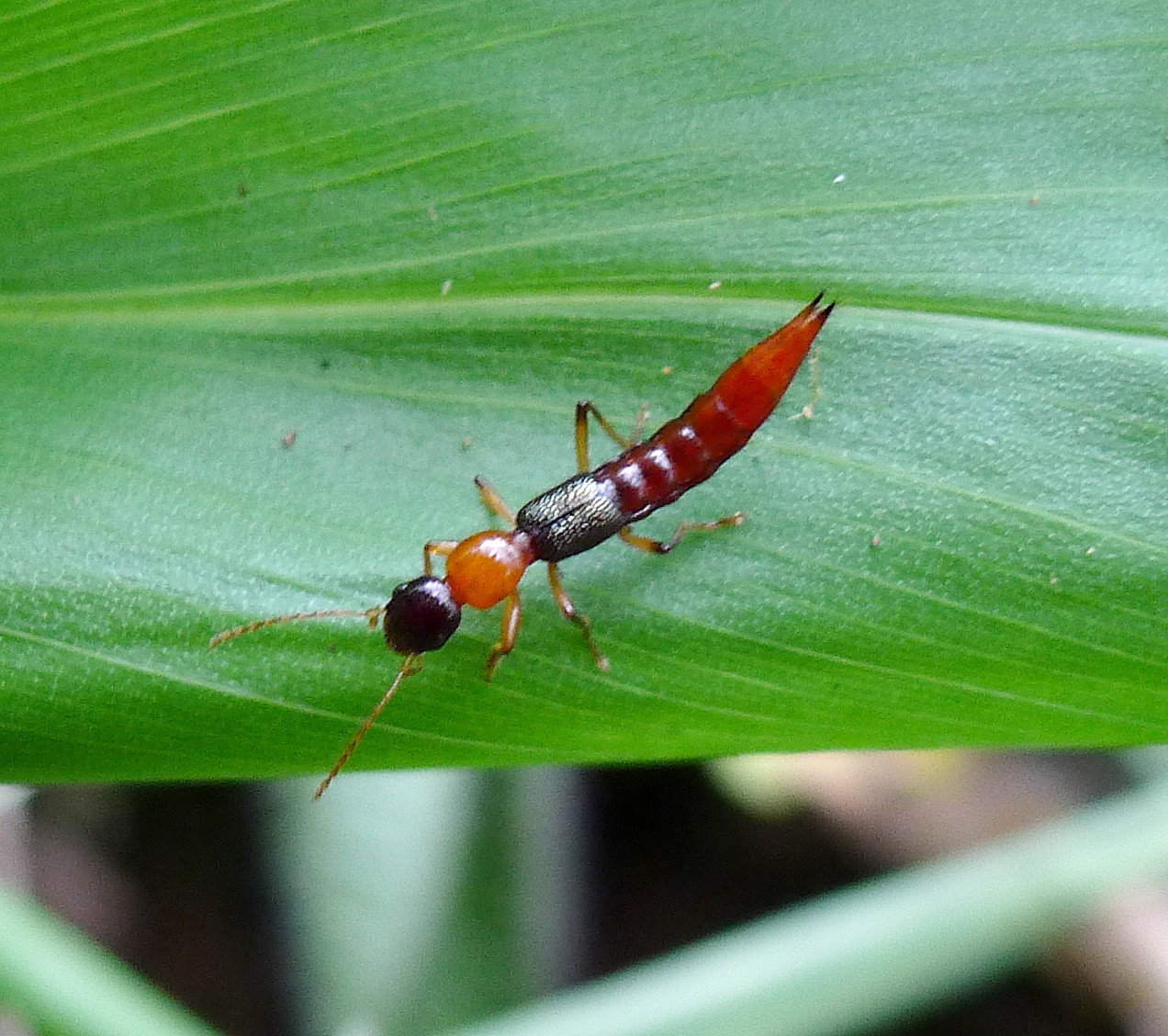
When present, elytra of the Staphylinidae are markedly abbreviate.

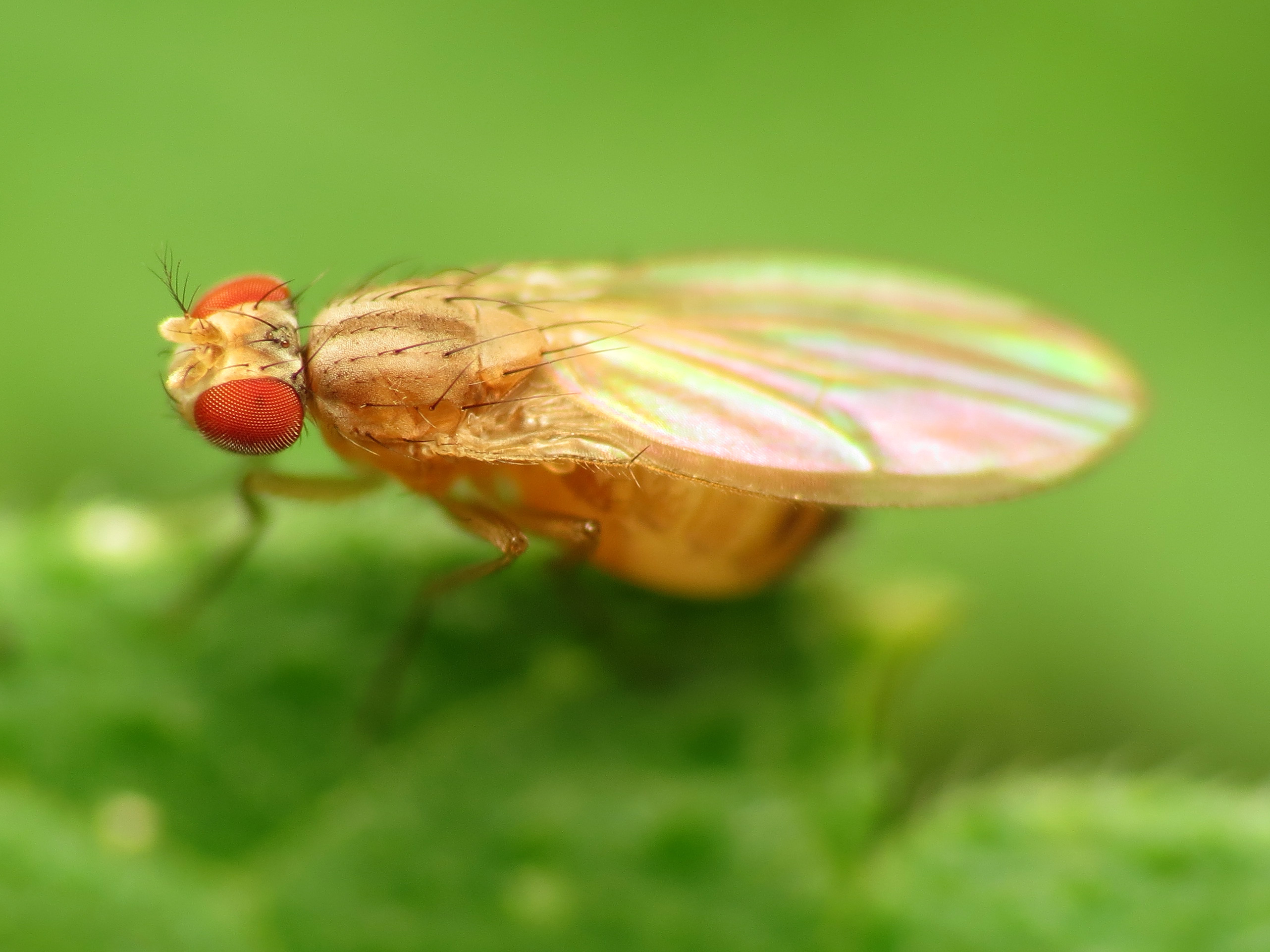
This fly in the genus Scaptomyza has clearly visible rows of para-sagittal acrostichal bristles on its thorax

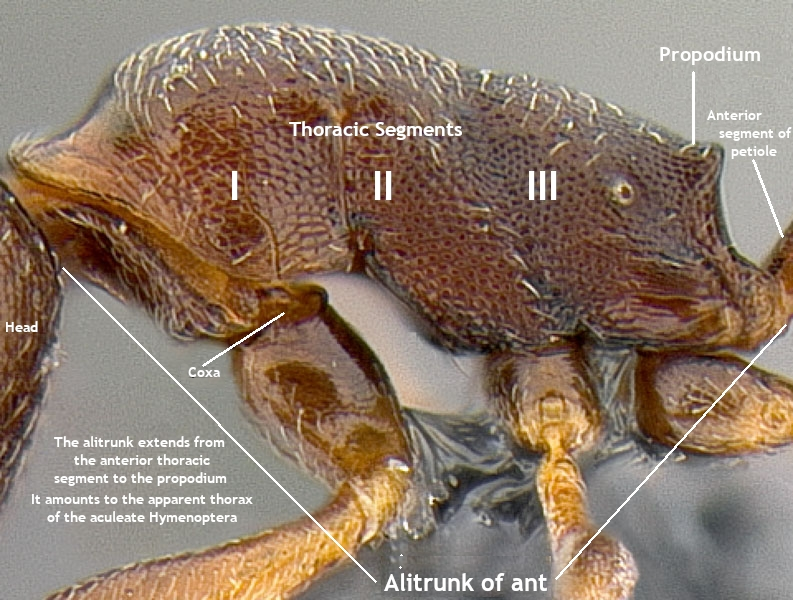
the alitrunk of aculeate Hymenoptera comprises the three thoracic segments, plus the propodeum, which strictly speaking, is the first segment of the abdomen.

== A–C ==
abbreviate(d)
(adjective) Of an organ or member: markedly or unexpectedly short in proportion to the rest of the body
abdomen
Body of the insect, toward the posterior of the thorax.
abdominal feet
See proleg
Acalyptrata
See Acalyptratae
acanthus
thornlike projection, typically a single-celled cuticular growth without tormogen (socket) or sensory cells.
acaricide
A chemical employed to kill and control mites and ticks.
acariphagous
feeding on mites (also refers to parasitoids of mites).
accessory gland
Any secondary gland of the glandular system.
accessory pulsatile organs (APOs)
Small muscular pumps and the veins that accompany them that pump hemolymph into the wings.
acetyl choline
Alternative spelling of "acetylcholine".
acrostichal bristles
The two rows of hairs or bristles lying one on either side of the mid-line of the thorax of a true fly.
active space
The space within which the concentration of a pheromone or other behaviorally active substance is concentrated enough to generate the required response, remembering that like light and sound pheromones become more dilute the further they radiate out from their source.
aculeate
(Hymenoptera) Any member of a group of families that include the familiar stinging ants, bees, and social and hunting wasp.
acuminate
Tapering to a long point.
acylurea
A class of insect growth regulators.
adecticous
Of pupa: the state in which the pupa does not possess movable mandibles, the opposite being decticous.
adipocytes
A major cell type of insects that stores fat body and reserves nutrients.
admarginal
(adjective): Along the margin.
aedeagus
The sclerotized terminal portion of the male genital tract that is inserted into the female during insemination. Its shape is often important in separating closely related species.
aestivation
Summer dormancy, entered into when conditions are unfavourable for active life i.e. it is too hot or too dry.
age polyethism
The regular changing of roles of colony members as they get older.
air sac
A dilated portion of a trachea.
alar squama
The middle of three flap-like outgrowths at the base of the wing in various flies.
alary muscles
Muscles along the dorsal diaphragm that may drive circulation.
alata
The parthenogenetic winged morph of vividae, specialized for migration.
alate
Winged; having wings.
aldrin
A synthetic chlorinated hydrocarbon insecticide, toxic to vertebrates. Though its phytotoxicity is low, solvents in some formulations may damage certain crops. cf. the related Dieldrin, Endrin, Isodrin
algophagy
Feeding on algae.
alitrunk
Name given to the thorax plus propodeum of 'wasp-waisted' aculeate Hymenoptera The term is now dated, and seldom used, but it describes the apparent "thorax" of bees, wasps, and ants, which actually incorporates the first abdominal segment, which precedes the petiole.
Alloparenting
When individuals other than the parent assist in the caring for that parents offspring. Alloparenting takes many forms, including castes in social insects raising the offspring of reproductives, and slave ant workers feeding the larvae of the slaver species.
allopatric
Refers to the state when two or more populations, such as different species, or forms of one species have essentially separate distributions. cf. sympatry, parapatric
alternating generations
When two generations are produced within a life cycle each producing individuals of only one sex, either male first and then female or vice versa.
altruistic
Self-destructive. or potentially self-destructive behavior performed for the benefit of others.
alula
A broad lobe at the proximal posterior margin of the wing stalk of Diptera. Also termed the axillary lobe.
ambrosia
The fungus cultivated by wood-boring beetles of the family Scolytidae.
Ametabola
Originally: The now obsolete subclass of Hexapoda that develop without clearly defined stages of metamorphosis, such as nymph, larva, pupa, adult; namely the Thysanura, Protura, Diplura, and Collembola. Also known as the Apterygota. Subsequently the others have been reclassified as separate from the Insecta, while the Thysanura have been split into the orders Archaeognatha and Zygentoma
amide
Compound derived from carboxylic acids by replacing the hydroxyl of the -COOH by the amino group, -NH_{2}-.
amine
An organic compound containing nitrogen, derived from ammonia, NH_{3}, by replacing one or more hydrogen atoms by as many hydrocarbon radicals.
amino acid
Organic compounds that contain the amino (NH_{2}) group and the carboxyl (COOH) group. Amino acids are the "building stones" of proteins.
ammonia
A colorless alkaline gas, NH_{3}, soluble in water.
anal
Pertaining to last abdominal segment which bears the anus.
anal angle
The posterior corner of the wing (same as tornus).
anal fold
A fold in the inner margin of the hindwing.
anal valves
Exposed claspers at the end of the abdomen.
anaplasmosis
Infection with Anaplasma, a genus of Sporozoa that infests red blood cells.
anasa wilt
A wilt disease of cucurbits caused solely by the feeding of the squash bug, no parasitic microorganism involved.
androconia
(singula = Androconium) In male butterflies, specialised wing scales (often called scent scales) possessing special glands which produce a chemical attractive to females.
androconium or androconia (plural)
Specialised microscopic scales on the wings of male butterflies, believed to be scent scales for attracting the female.
annulate
Formed in ring-like segments or with ring-like markings.

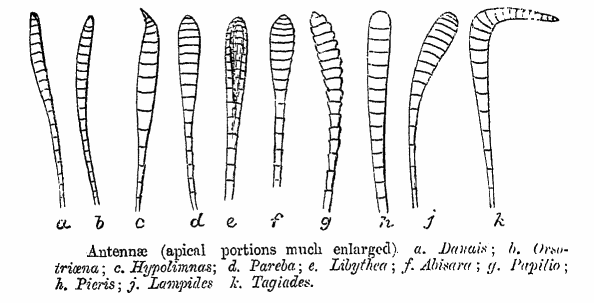
Butterfly antennae shapes

anemic
Deficient in blood quantity or quality.
anteclypeus
the lower (anterior) portion of the clypeus of insects.
antennae
The long feelers situated on the head and close to the eyes. They are however not tactile but used for detecting airborne scents and currents.
- In Papilionoidea the antennae end in bulging tips called clubs.
- In Hesperioidea they have hooked tips and the club is found just before the tip.
- In some Lycaenidae like the genus Liphyra the antenna tapers gradually.
antennation
Touching with the antenna.
antenniferous
Bearing antennae, as in "antenniferous tubercle".
antennomere
A segment of an antenna. The term antennomere is used in particular when the segments are fairly uniform, as in filiform antennae, but it also may be used in referring to segments of odd sizes, shapes and functions, such as the scape and pedicel. More specific terms may be used where there are distinct antennal regions; for example flagellomeres are the antennomeres comprising the flagellum.
anterior
in front of or after the aforementioned structure.
antenodal veins
Small cross-veins at the front of the dragonfly or damselfly wing, between the wing base and the nodus.
anthophagy
feeding on flowers.
antibiosis
An association between two or more organisms that is detrimental to one or more of them.
anticoagulin
A substance antagonistic to the coagulation of blood.
anus
The posterior opening of the digestive tract.
apex / apical area
The anterior corner of the wing.
apical cell
The first posterior cell in the wing of Diptera. It is the space between the third and fourth longitudinal vein beyond the anterior crossvein (R5).
aphidophagy
feeding on aphids (and parasitoids of aphids).
apitherapy
Medicinal use of the honey bee or its products.
Apterygota
Originally an alternate name for the then recognised subclass Ametabola
arculus
A crossvein between the radius and cubitus near the base of the wing in certain insects.
areola
1. A small ring of color
2. In crayfish, the hourglass pattern on the dorsal surface of the cephalothorax
arolium
A pad-like median lobe between the tarsal claws.
base / basal area of wing
Region close to the point of attachment to the thorax.
basal streak (Noctuidae)
also basal dash — a typically short and broad line at the mid-basal area of the forewing of noctuid moths.See figures 4, 5
brand
Raised area on the wing surface, circular, ovate, or elongated, which is covered with special scent scales or androconia, found in males of some species. Also called sex mark.
bryophagy
feeding on moss.

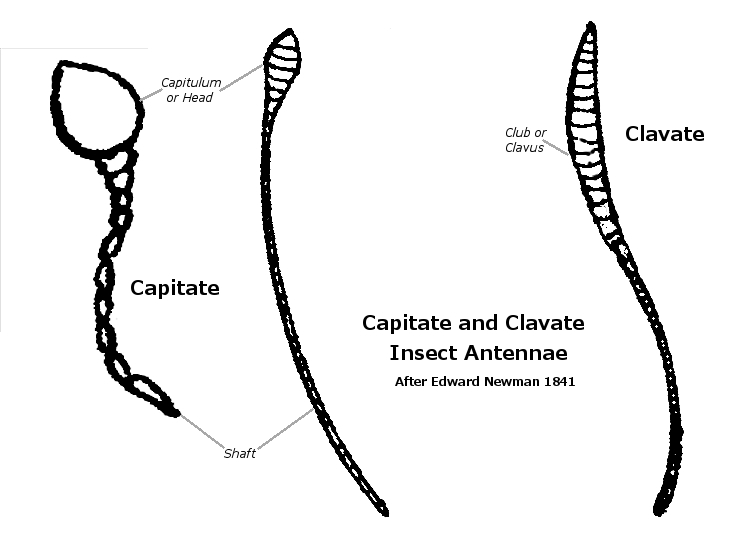
Distinction between clavate and capitate anatomy of insect antennae

capitate
Mainly referring to antennae, but occasionally to other anatomical features such as palps: having a clubbed shape with a relatively long, slender stem, but with an abruptly bulkier, thicker, possibly globular distal head, the capitulum. The term capitate is not strictly distinguished from clavate, but where a distinction is desired, it is that the club of a capitate antenna is abruptly distinct from the shaft, and the head tends to be short and more or less globular. The club of a clavate antenna generally is a more or less tapered thickening, sometimes hardly distinct from the shaft.
capitulum
The head of a capitate structure, such as a capitate antenna, or of a capitate haltere
carina
a keel-like elevation (or ridge) on the body-wall of an insect.
carpophagy
feeding on fruits and seeds.
catenulate
Markings consisting of rings connected together like a chain.
- catenulated antennae
  Antennae with ringed appearance.
cell
The central area surrounded by veins. It can be closed by veins or open.
- The vein forming the boundary of the cell along the costal margin is known as the subcostal vein q.v.
- The vein forming the lower boundary towards the dorsum is called the median vein.
- In the case of butterflies, the cell is closed by a vein connecting the origins of veins 6 to 4 along the top of the cell which is known as discocellular vein.
cell cup
Taxonomically important term used in Diptera identification keys. Part of the schema of wing venation. Also called the posterior cubital cell and often called the anal cell. see File:Phytomyzinae wing veins-1.svg
central shade or median shade
Taxonomically important term used in moth description. It is a transverse band in the median area of the wing. See figures 4, 5
ceratophagy (Also spelled keratophagy)
feeding on cornified tissues and hair of animals.
cervix
(Anatomical feature) the structure defining the neck of the insect.
chaeta
See Seta.
chaetosema
patch of sensory bristles.
chalaza
An external spine that has a single point. Etymology: Greek chalasa, a tubercle. cf. scolus, which has multiple points.
cheta
See Seta.
cilia
Fine hairs along the edges of the wing. Etymology: Latin 'eyelash'
clasper or clasp
A structure in male insects that is used to hold the female during copulation.

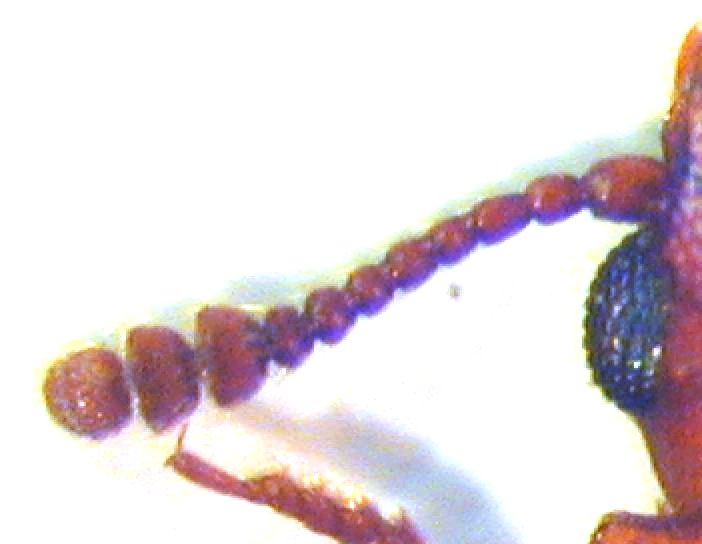
Clavate antenna of a beetle in the family Erotylidae. In this specimen the clavus comprises three segments

clava
Same as clavus.
clavate
Mainly referring to antennae, but occasionally to other anatomical features such as palps: having a clubbed shape with a relatively long, slender stem, but with a bulkier, thicker distal end, the clava. The term clavate is not strictly distinguished from capitate, but in general, where a distinction is desired, the club of a capitate antenna is abruptly distinct, even globular, whereas the club of a clavate antennae is generally a more or less tapered thickening
claviform stigma
specifically, in Noctuidae (moths)- an elongate spot or mark extending from the anterior transverse anterior line through the submedian interspace, toward and sometimes to the posterior transverse line.See figures 4, 5
clavola
Same as clavus or club
clavus
1. The thicker distal end of a clavate anatomical structure such as an antenna. Usually comprising more than one joint. Also called clava, clavola, or club
2. The posterior of the portion of the remigium found on insect wings.
3. The oblong sclerite at the base of the inferior margin of the hemelytron in Heteroptera.
4. The knob at the end of the stigmal or radial veins in the wings of certain Hymenoptera.
club
The popular (possibly to be preferred) name for the clavus of a clavate antenna.
clypeus
(Anatomical feature) a sclerite structure below the frons, circumposed by the mandibles and above the labrum.
coccidophagy
feeding on scale insects (and parasitoids of scale insects).

Terms associated with the wings

compound eye
An eye consisting of a large number of individual photoreceptor units or ommatidia (ommatidium, singular).Figure 2 d below
connexivum or connexiva (plural)
(largely in Heteroptera and similarly dorsoventrally flattened insects) the edge of the abdomen, containing the connection between the tergite and sternite. May be visible from above in species such as many of the Reduviidae.
copromycetophagy
inhabiting feces and consuming mycetes growing inside or cultivating them for feeding.
coprophagy
feeding on the excrements of animals.
costa / costal area
The front or top border of the wing. The leading edge of the wing, from base to apex.
costal break
Taxonomically important term used in Diptera identification keys. Part of the schema of wing venation. weakenings of the costa (one to three in number). They are flexing points for the wings during flight
costal fold
A fold in the leading edge of the forewing of Lepidoptera, containing androconia.
coronal suture
(Anatomical feature) an anterior suture line of the head between the compound eyes, below the median ocellus.
coxa
first leg segment, between body and trochanter.

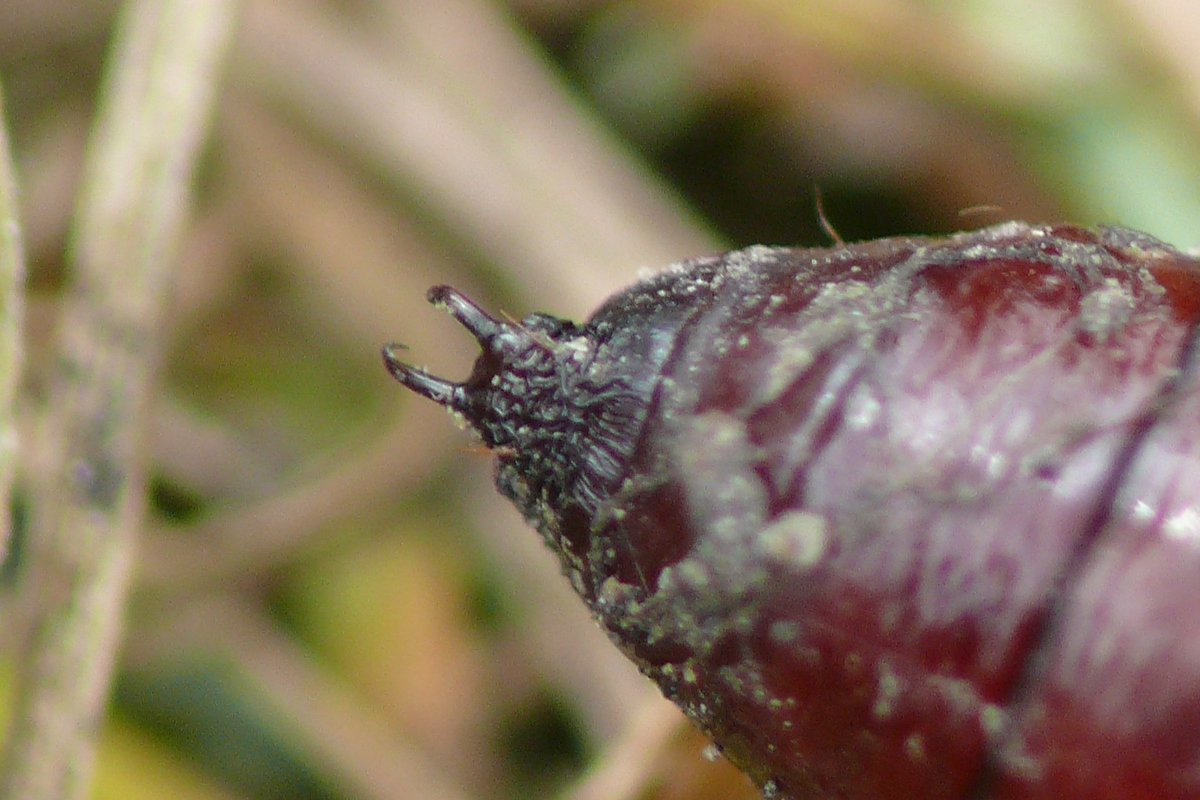
Cremaster of pupa of the oak owl moth, Griposia aprilina

cremaster
A general term for a structure by which an object hangs (from Greek language kremastos, meaning "hung up"); for example in entomology:
in some Lepidoptera, including most butterflies, the pupa attaches to a surface by the cremaster, a structure at the tip of the pupal abdomen. The cremaster is the homologue of the anal plate of the caterpillar. It takes various forms in different species, ranging from a simple point, to various arrangements of hooks that catch Velcro-like in a silken pad that the caterpillar spins on the surface before it enters the prepupal phase.
crenulate
Adjective = scalloped. Describes the outer edge of a wing that is convex at the end of each vein and concave in between.
cuneus
Noun = wedge. Particularly in mirid bugs, a wedge-shaped section of the hemelytra (forewings), located at the apex of the thick, leathery part of the wings.

== D–F ==
decticous
Functional mandibles present in pupal state.
dendrophagy
feeding on trees.
dentate
As for crenulate but with the projections at the end of each wing being toothlike.
detritophagy
feeding on ground remains of plants and animals.
dieldrin
A synthetic chlorinated hydrocarbon insecticide, toxic to vertebrates. cf. the related Aldrin, Endrin, Isodrin
disc / discal area
The central band passing through the cell.
discoidal cell
In damselflies (Zygoptera) a basal quadrangular cell in the wing venation, which is delimited by veins MA (anterior side), MP (posterior side), MAb (distal side) and the arculus (basal side).
dorsum / dorsal area
The trailing edge or hind-margin of the wing, extending from the base to the tornus. Dorsal alternately, also refers to the back, i.e. the upper part of the body, from above.
ectognathous
(Anatomical feature) having exterior mouthparts, or exposed. A defining feature of insects.
elytron
(Anatomical feature) the modified, hardened forewing of certain insect orders, notably beetles (Coleoptera) and some of the true bugs (Hemiptera).

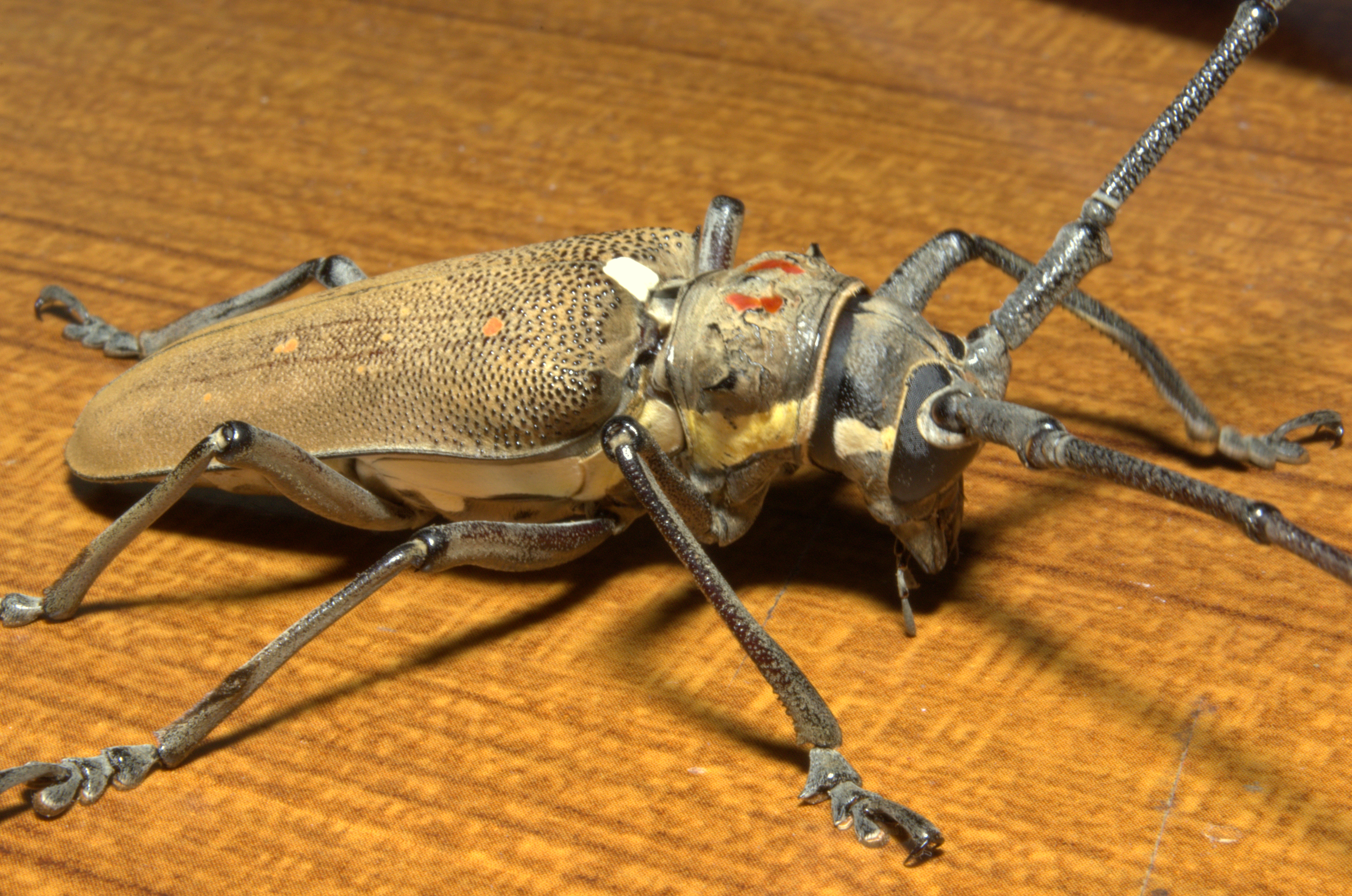
Beetle in the family Cerambycidae with conspicuous emargination of the compound eye (black) where it extends partway round the base of the antenna

emarginate
(Anatomical feature) Describing a margin, such as the edge of an eye or sclerite, where the outline includes a concave section as if a part of the region had been "cut out" or displaced. It might take the form of a notch, or a rounded or possibly quadrate hollow, such as where a compound eye is distorted in fitting around the base of the antenna.
empodium
(Anatomical feature) either a bristle-like or pad-like structure between the tarsal claws of various insects, notably Diptera.
encapsulation
the immuno response by plasmatocytes to the presence of parasitoid egg or larvae which results in the formation of a multilayered capsule that causes the parasitoid to sufficate or starve.
Endrin
A synthetic chlorinated hydrocarbon insecticide, toxic to vertebrates. Though its phytotoxicity is low, solvents in some formulations may damage certain crops. cf. the related Dieldrin, Aldrin, Isodrin
entomonecrophagy
feeding on dead arthropods.
entomophagy
feeding on other insects.
epicranius
(Anatomical feature) the top of the anterior structure of the head, or forehead.
epiproct
(Anatomical feature) a plate or projection dorsal to the anus in certain insects, generally on abdominal segment X or XI. For example in Archaeognatha, Zygentoma and Ephemeroptera, it takes the form of a long, rearwardly directed caudal filament resembling the two cerci that flank it. In the Odonata epiprocts have various functions, both in larvae, in which they may have respiratory roles, and in adults, in which they may have reproductive roles. Not all epiprocts in all insect species are homologous. Note that the term is used in other groups than insects as well, for instance Myriapoda.
erect
The palpi when vertical, i.e. the axis of the palpi is at right angles to the axis of the body.
exarate
Pupae with their legs and other appendages free and extended.

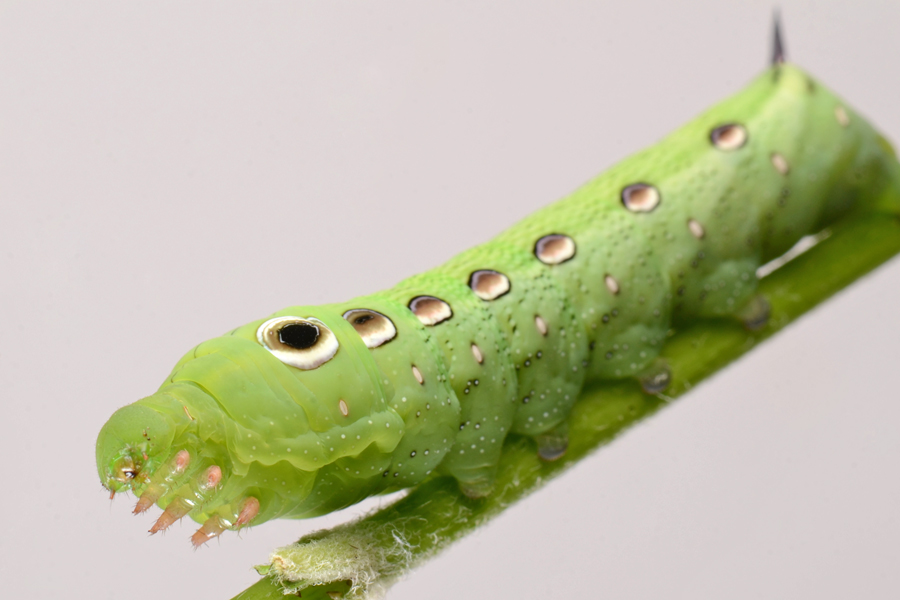
Larva of a species in the family Sphingidae. The large eyespots on the back have no function concerning vision at all; when threatened, the caterpillar retracts its head, leaving the spots resembling either a threat, or as a more tempting target than the vulnerable head. The stemmata are visible as an arc of about four tiny spots slightly lateral to, and above the mouthparts. They are inconspicuous and do have a visual function.

eyespots
1. Spots or other patterns resembling vertebrate eyes on the skin, such as on larvae of some Sphingidae or the wings of moths such as many Saturniidae. Such eyespots have no visual function, but act variously to misdirect or discourage attacks from predators.
2. Simple eyes such as ocelli or stemmata
face
the area between the base of antennae, oral margin, eyes and cheeks (gena). See figure 3.
fascia (plural fasciae)
A color pattern with a broad band.
femur
third leg segment, between trochanter and tibia.
flagellomere
an antennomere comprising part of the flagellum.
flagellum
the part of the antenna distal to the pedicel composed of one or more segments, called flagellomeres.
foramen magnum
(Anatomical feature) the posterior opening of the head capsule, covered by the cervix.
forewing
(Anatomical feature) the pair of wings of a four-winged insect closest to the head.
fovea
small, pit-like structure in the exoskeleton.
frons
(Anatomical feature) The frontal area of an insect's head. It covers the upper part of the face above the clypeus and below and between the antennae. It supports the pharyngeal dilator muscles and usually bears an ocellus.
frontal sutures
(Anatomical feature) suture lines that meet with the coroanl sutures to form an inverted Y.

== G–L ==
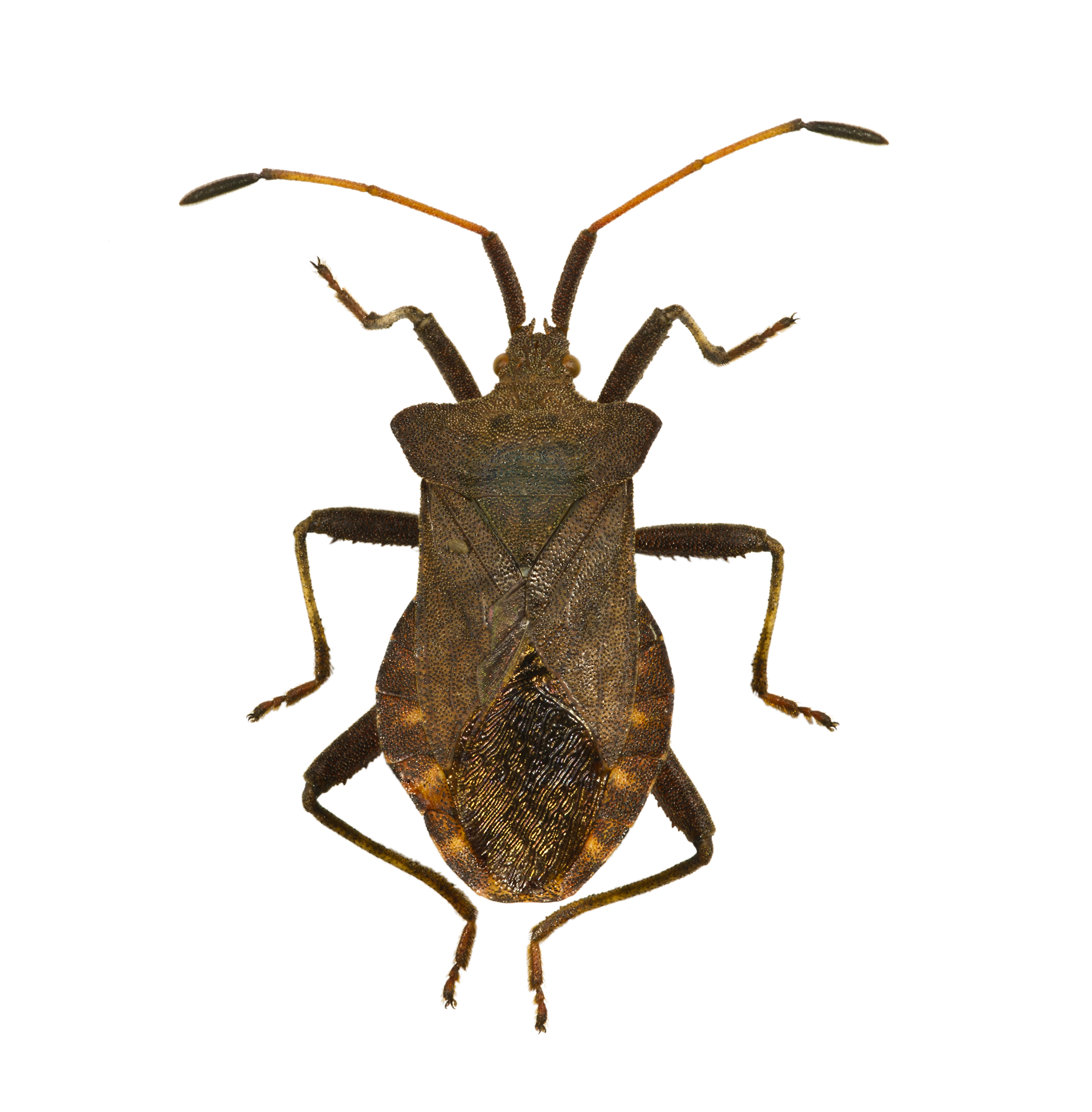
A "true" bug, order Hemiptera, with geniculate antennae

gena
(Anatomical feature) the area below the compound eyes, the insect equivalent to human cheeks.
geniculate
Elbowed. From the Latin for a bended knee, referring to an organ of a type not always expected to be kinked, but having a definite angular bend or hinge. In entomology the term typically refers to an elbowed antenna. For instance, many species of Hemiptera, Coleoptera, and Hymenoptera have markedly geniculate antennae
girdle
a strand of silk used to prop up the pupa. Found especially in the Papilionidae.
glabrous
smooth, without hairs or scales.
gula
ventral head sclerite which supports the submentum
helminthophagy
feeding on worms classified with helminths (including parasitoids of helminths).
hemocoel
the interior of the insects anatomy, including all organs and hemocyte.
hemocyte or haemolymph
a fluid in the circulatory system of insects containing nutrients, fat, water, etc.
hemophagy
feeding on blood.
herbiphagy
feeding on herbaceous plants.
hindwing
(Anatomical feature) the pair of wings of a four-winged insect furthest from the head.
hyaline
transparent, like glass.
hygropetric
mode of life: living in the thin film of water on wet rocks.

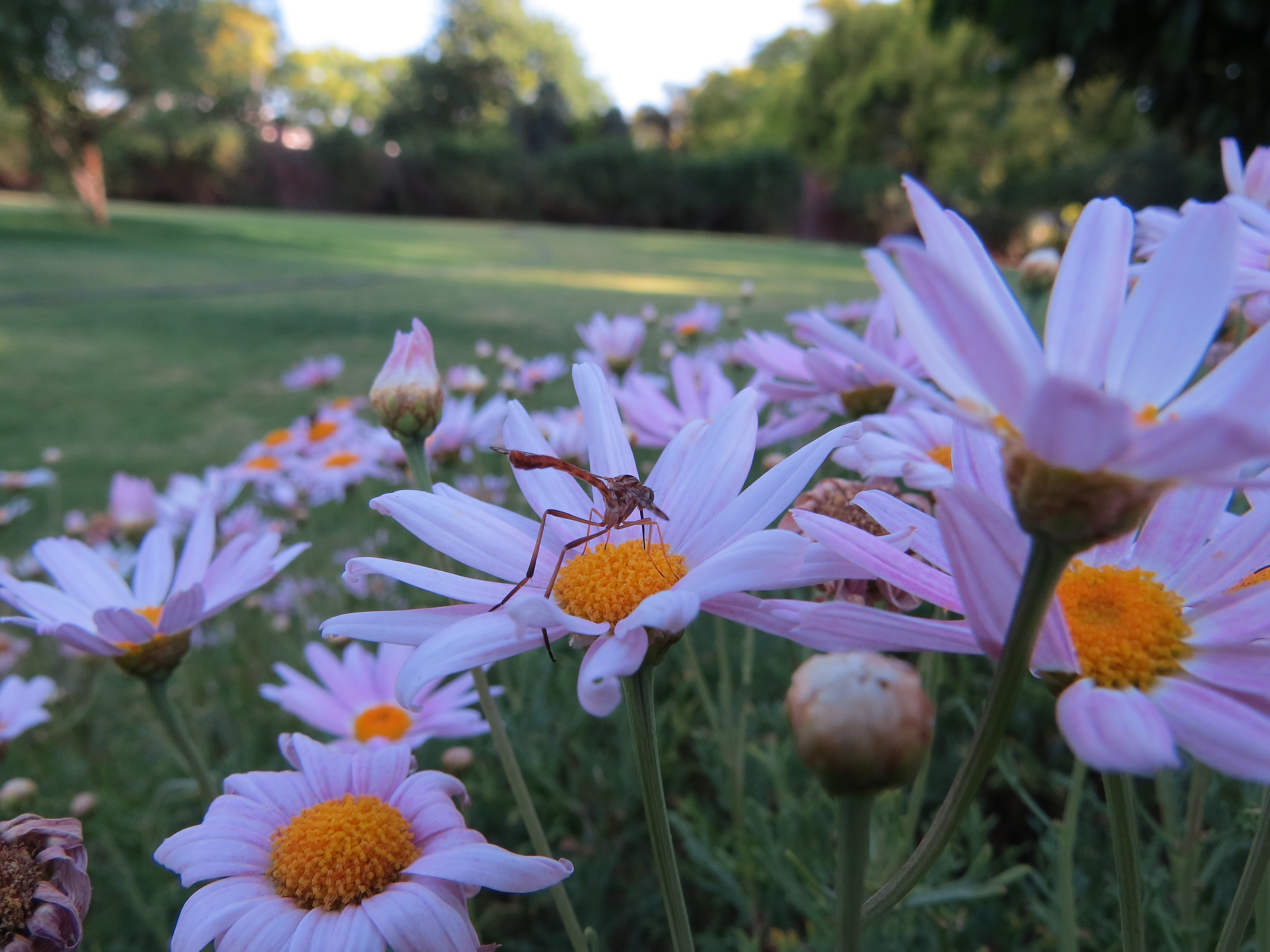
A fly in the family Vermileonidae, using its hypognathous proboscis to extract nectar from florets.

hypognathous
having mouthparts that are ventrad of a vertically oriented head, "pointing downwards", or having an "under bit", instead of pointing backwards or forwards.
hypopharynx
Mouthpart. A tonguelike lobe on the floor of the mouth.
idiobiont
a form of parasitism where the parasitoid paralyzes or leaves the host unable to continue development at oviposition.
imago
(plural is usually imagines) The final, or adult, stage in metamorphosis.

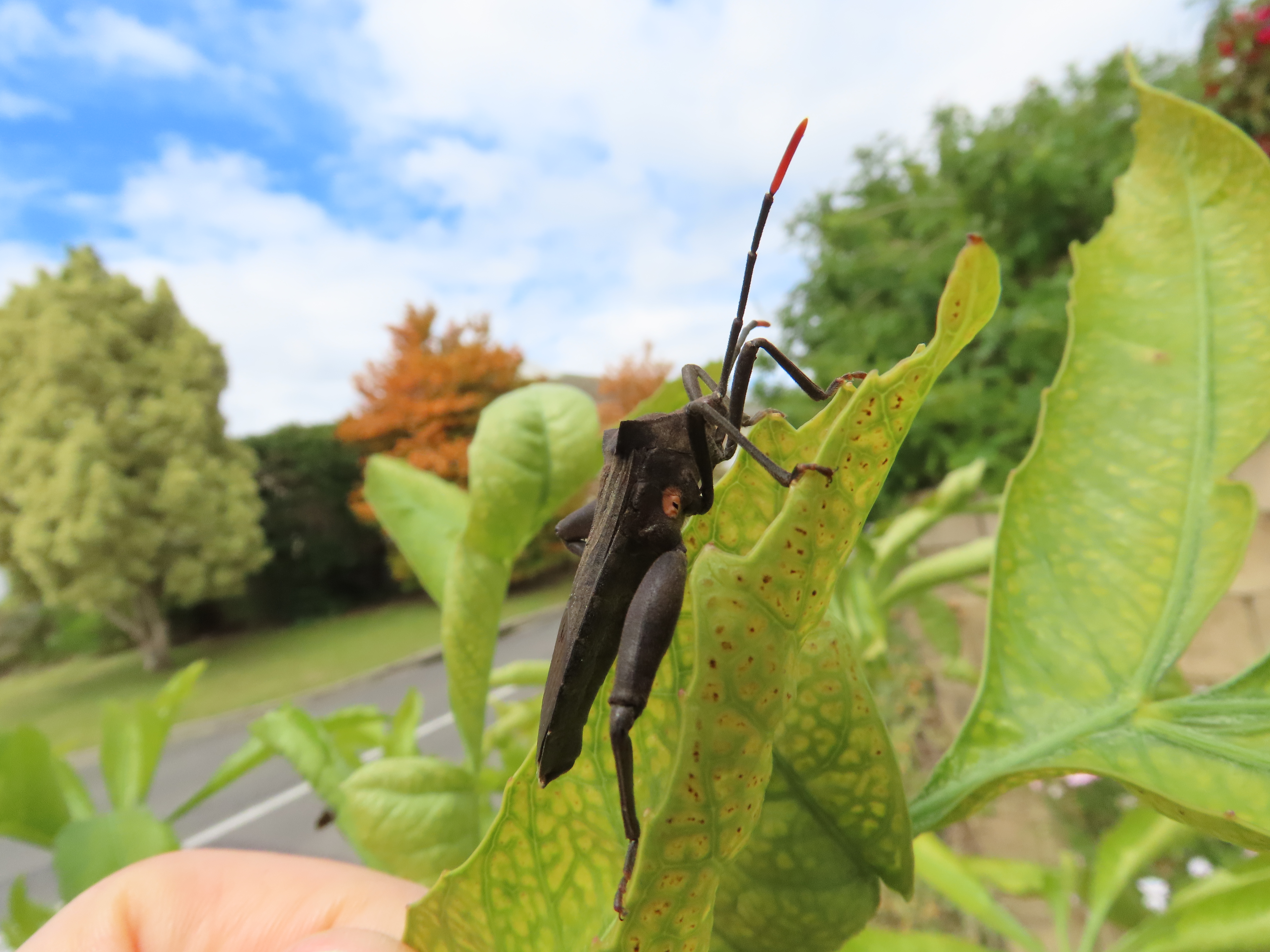
Coreidae: adult male Anoplocnemis with incrassate posterior femur

incrassate
localised thickening of a member such as an antenna or leg.
interspace
The region between adjacent veins.
irrorated or irroration
Old term used usually to indicate a sprinkling of scales interspersed among scales typically of a different color.
Isodrin
A synthetic chlorinated hydrocarbon insecticide, toxic to vertebrates. Though its phytotoxicity is low, solvents in some formulations may damage certain crops. cf. the related Dieldrin, Aldrin, Endrin
keratophagy (Also spelt ceratophagy)
feeding on cornified tissues and hair of animals.
koinobiont
A form of parasitoidy where the parasitoid lives inside the host while allowing it to live after oviposition.

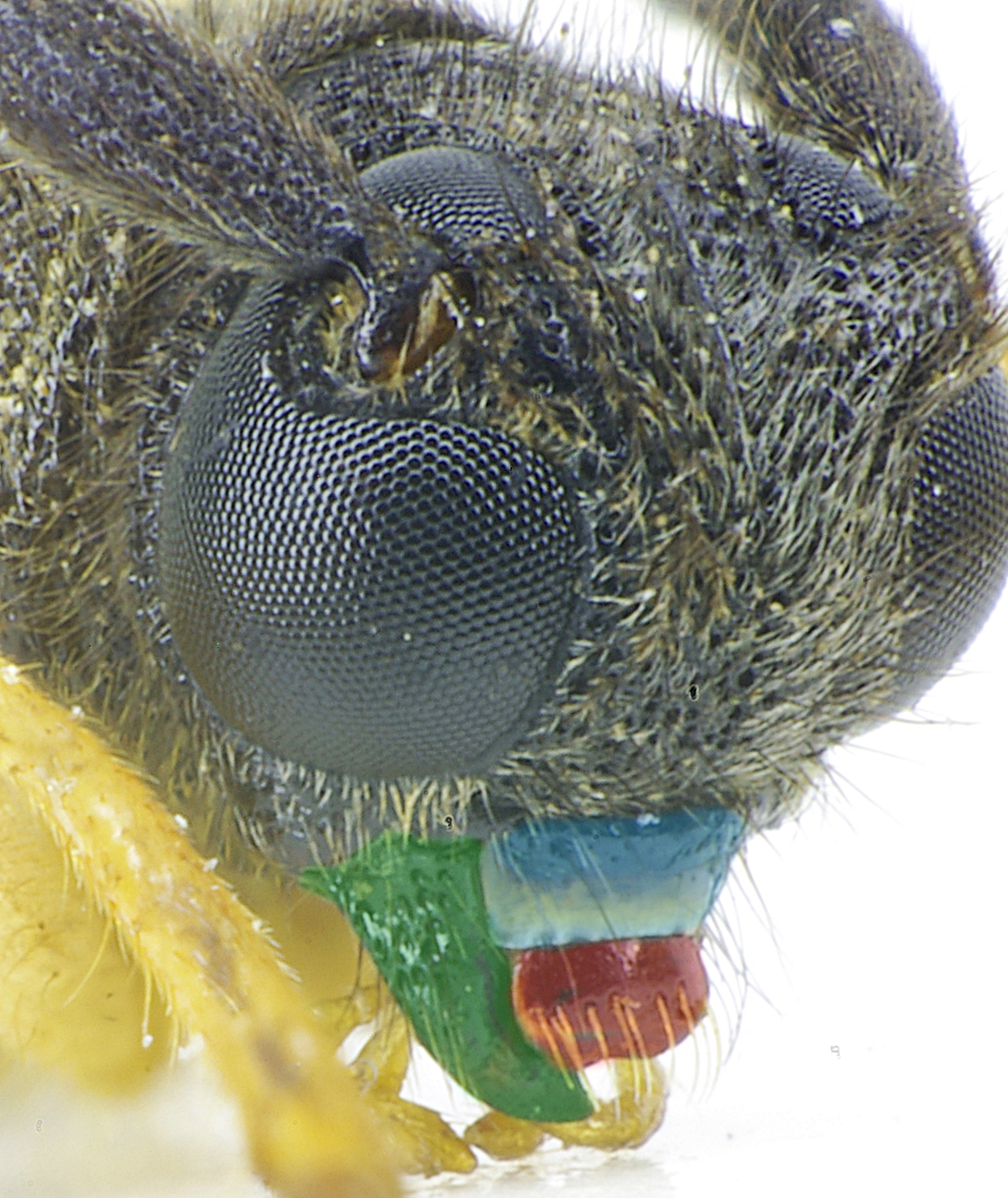
Head of a beetle in the family Cerambycidae; showing the labrum in red, below the clypeus in blue

labium
Mouthpart forming the lower lip. Bears the labial palps.
labrum
(Anatomical feature) the anterior structure below the clypeus covering some of the mouthparts, sometimes called the "upper lip".

Diagram of an insect leg

lichenophagy
feeding on lichens.
Leading Edge
The front or top border of the wing. The Costa.
lines (moth)
transverse line markings on the wings of moths, mainly Noctuidae- basal line; inner line; outer line; submarginal line.See figures 4, 5
lines of weakness
(Anatomical feature) the suture lines where the integument will split to allow for molting or autotomy.
lunule
A body area or marking roughly in the shape of a crescent.

== M–O ==
macrochaete
large bristles and scales.
macropterous
Having long or large elytra, as long, or longer than the abdomen.
malacophagy
feeding on mollusks (and parasitoids of mollusks).
maxilla
Mouthpart. The maxillae are paired and arranged behind the mandibles. May bear palps. See Figures 1 and 3.
membranule
a small triangular opaque region at the base of the hindwing in some dragonflies.
mesothorax
the middle segment of the thorax, between the prothorax and the metathorax.
metalmarks
small metallic-looking spots commonly found on the wings of Riodinidae.
metathorax
The third and last segment of the thorax after the mesothorax.
micropterous
Having short elytra, shorter than the abdomen.
mixomycetophagy
feeding on myxomycetes slime molds.
myiasis
Infestation of fly larvae on or in a vertebrate host.
mycetophagy
feeding on fungus.
necrophagy
consuming of dead animals and their remains.
nervure
Older term for vein. adnervural refers to instance lines running adjacent and alongside the veins.
nodus
(of Odonata ) A prominent cross-vein near the center of the leading edge of a wing. Also called "node".
obtect
Appendages fused or glued to the body.
occipital suture
(Anatomical feature) the structure that defines the occiput. See Figure 1 (below).
occiput
(Anatomical feature) the region posterior to the vertex on the head. See Figure 2 (below).
ocular structure
(Anatomical feature) the structure of the head containing the ocelli.
onisciform
A woodlouse shaped, flattened platyform appearance of a larva.
oophagy
feeding on eggs.
opisthognathous
with receding mouthparts, or having mouthparts that slope backward or face backward.
orbicular stigma (or orbicular spot)
a marking placed between the reniform stigma and the thorax, usually circular in shape. See figures 4, 5
osmeterium
fleshy structure on some larvae, often discharging odorous chemicals.
oviposition
the act of laying eggs.
oviscape
if part of the ovipositor is visible when not in action, then the basal visible portion, typically tubular, is the oviscape. For examples, see females of many Tephritidae and Pyrgotidae (cf scape).
ovipositor
structure by which many insects place their eggs, sometimes by piercing or slitting the host or substrate in which she lays the eggs. The structure may be tubular and may have valves.
ozadene
a stink gland or repugnatorial gland, from which an animal such as an insect or Myriapod may release a foul-smelling liquid or gas for defence
ozopore
the opening of an ozadene, a stink gland or repugnatorial gland

== P–R ==
palynophagy
feeding on pollen.
parasitoid
parasite that develops attached to or within a host organism in a relationship which ultimately kills the host.
pedicel
the second segment ( antennomere) of the antenna. See figure 3.
pedipalp (or labial palpi or palpi)
comparatively large processes that originate from below the head and curve forward in front of the face that sometimes appear like a beak. lp on the figure right.
phloeophagy
feeding on phloem.
phyllophagy
feeding on leaves.
phytophagy
feeding on plants.
pleurite
A sclerotised region on the lateral part of an insect segment, bearing the spiracle, and separating and connecting the tergite and the sternite (compare: pulmonarium).
pollinophagy
feeding on pollen.

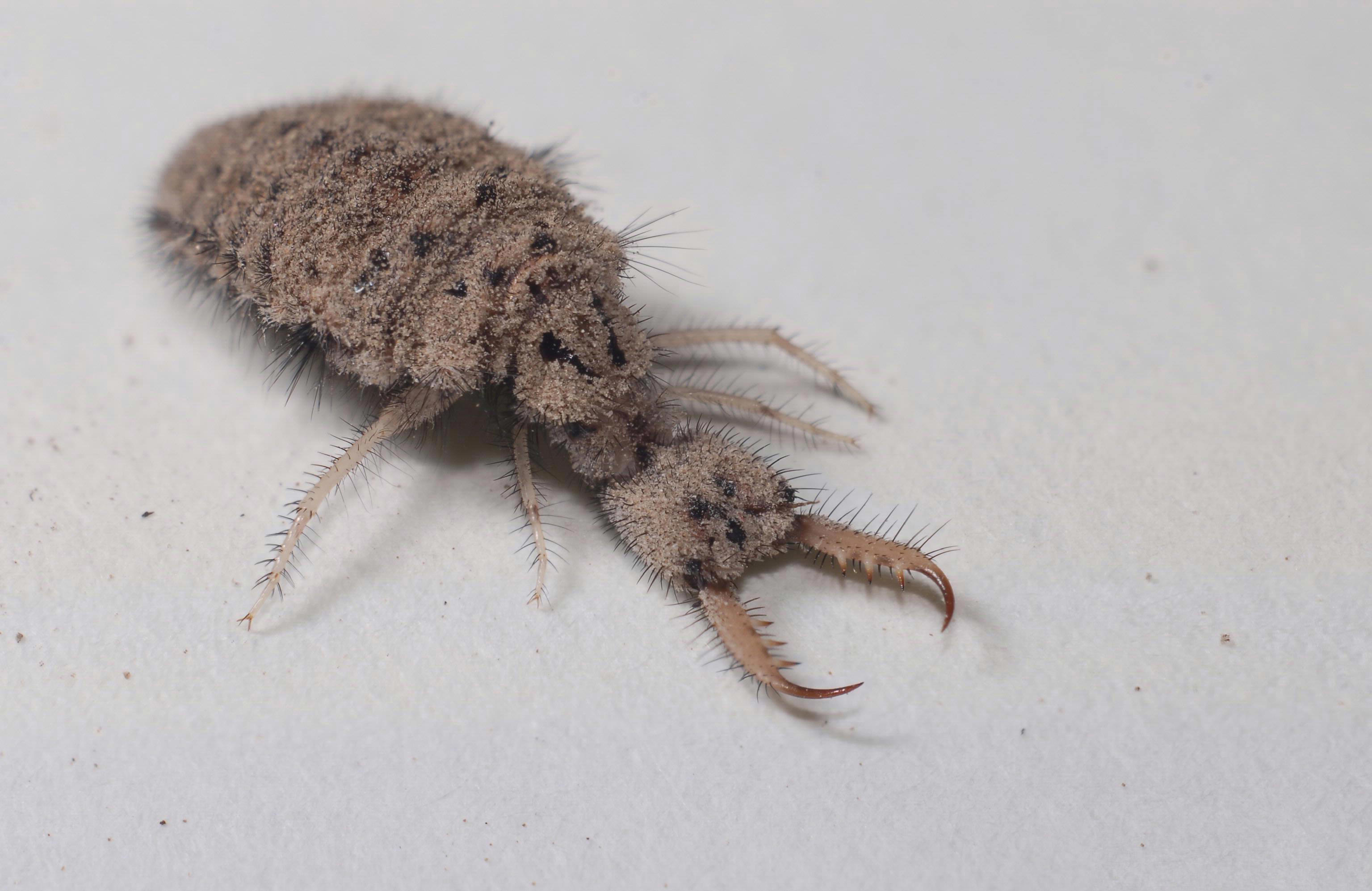
Porrect mandibles of antlion larva.

porrect
of organs extended horizontally anterior to the head. In such organs the axis of the organs is parallel to the axis of the body.
postclypeus
the upper (proximal) portion of the clypeus of insects.
postdiscal
The area, or band, of the wing between the discal area and the marginal area.
posterior
in a position behind or below the aforementioned.
postoccipital suture
(Anatomical feature) the structure posterior to the occipital suture, surrounding foramen magnum or occipital magnum.
proboscis
tubular feeding and sucking organ.
proclinate
Directed or leaning forward, such as in bristles in particular locations of insects' heads.

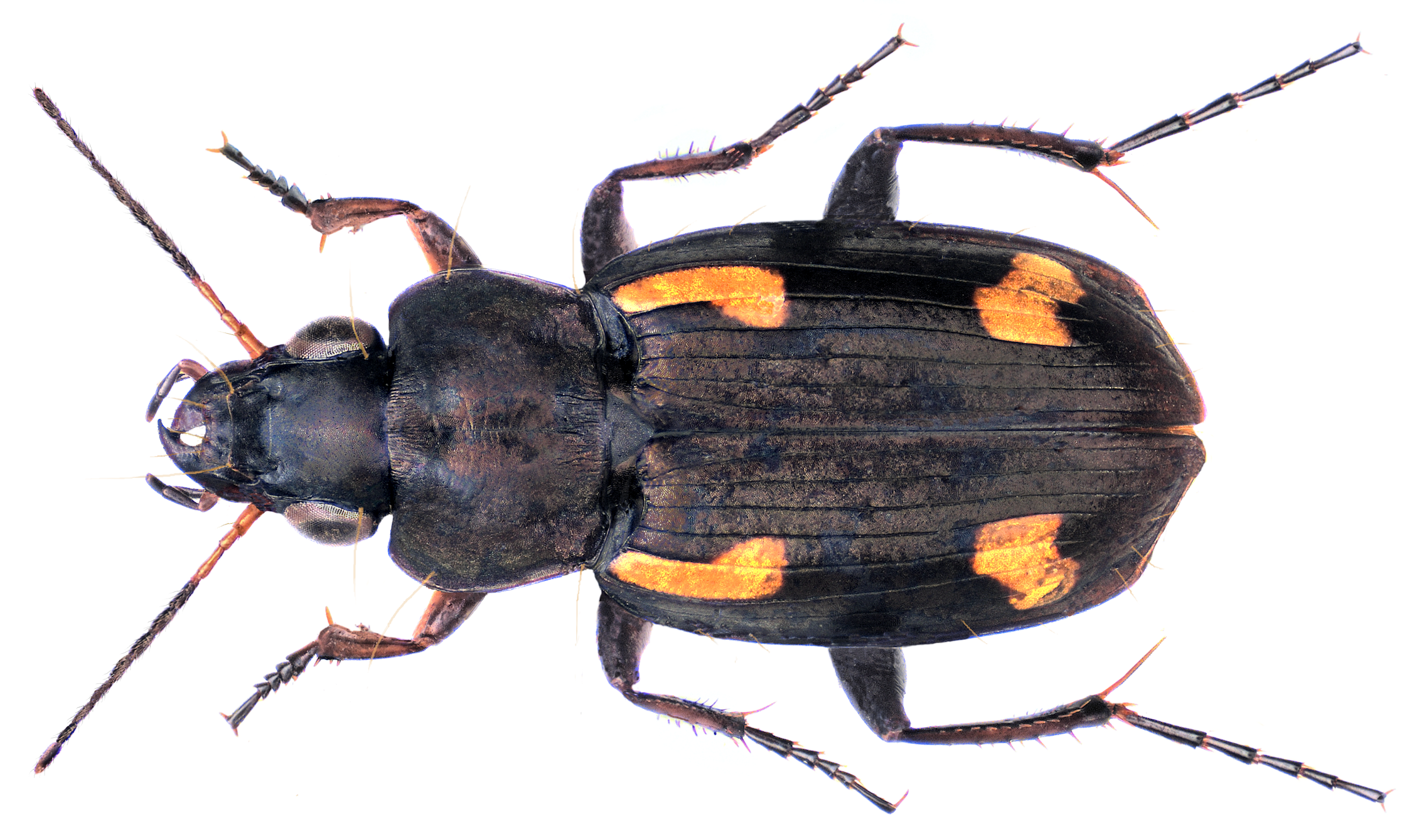
Beetles in the family Carabidae, generally have prognathous heads

prognathous
having mouth parts extended forward of the head, in contrast to opisthognathous and hypognathous.
proleg
fleshy leg like structures arising from the abdominal segments of caterpillars. These prolegs have crochets or curved hooks.
prothorax
The first segment on the thorax anterior to the mesothorax.
pterostigma (plural pterostigmata)
The prominent cell, usually opaque and coloured, near the tip of each wing of the Odonata, on the anterior margin; also, more loosely, called stigma.
pterothorax
The meso- and metathorax of winged insects, that carries the two pairs of wings.
pulmonarium (plural pulmonaria)
A membranous instead of a sclerotised connection or pleurite between the abdominal tergites and sternites of certain groups of insects; in such species the pulmonaria bear the spiracles. The term also refers to an abdomen in which the connection between the tergal and sternal sclerites takes the form of a pulmonarial membrane. (Compare: pleurite)
reniform stigma (or reniform spot)
an oval or kidney-shaped mark on the forewing at the disc (Lepidoptera) See figure 4

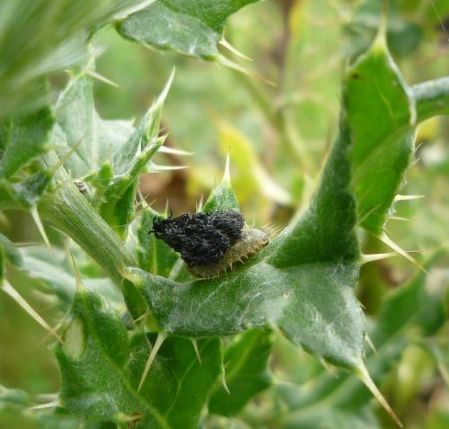
A Chrysomelid larva carrying its own frass as repugnatorial protection

repugnatorial
(generally in combination as in: "repugnatorial glands"): defensive, or "fighting back", in particular as applied to an ozadene, a gland that can release irritant, poisonous, alarming or distasteful fluids or gases when an organism is under threat. Examples of repugnatorial glands include the osmeterium of larvae of the Papilionidae, the stink glands of most Heteroptera, the ozadenes of Opiliones, the odoriferous glands of Diplopoda, and others. Some insects, such as larvae of many species of the Chrysomelidae, use their excreta in repugnatorial roles, for example covering themselves with their own frass.
rhizophagy
feeding on rhizomes.

== S–Z ==
saltatorial
adapted for leaping or jumping.
sarconecrophagy
feeding on dead bodies of vertebrates.
sapromycetophagy
inhabiting decaying matter and consuming mycetes growing inside or cultivating them for feeding.
saprophagy
feeding on decaying organic matter.
scape
the proximal segment ( antennomere) of the antenna. See Figure 3.
schisophagy
feeding on ground remains of plants and animals.
sclerite
a hardened plate in the exoskeleton of an arthropod. cf. e.g. sternite, tergite
scolus
An external spine having multiple points. Etymology: Greek skolos, a prickle. cf. chalaza. plural: scoli

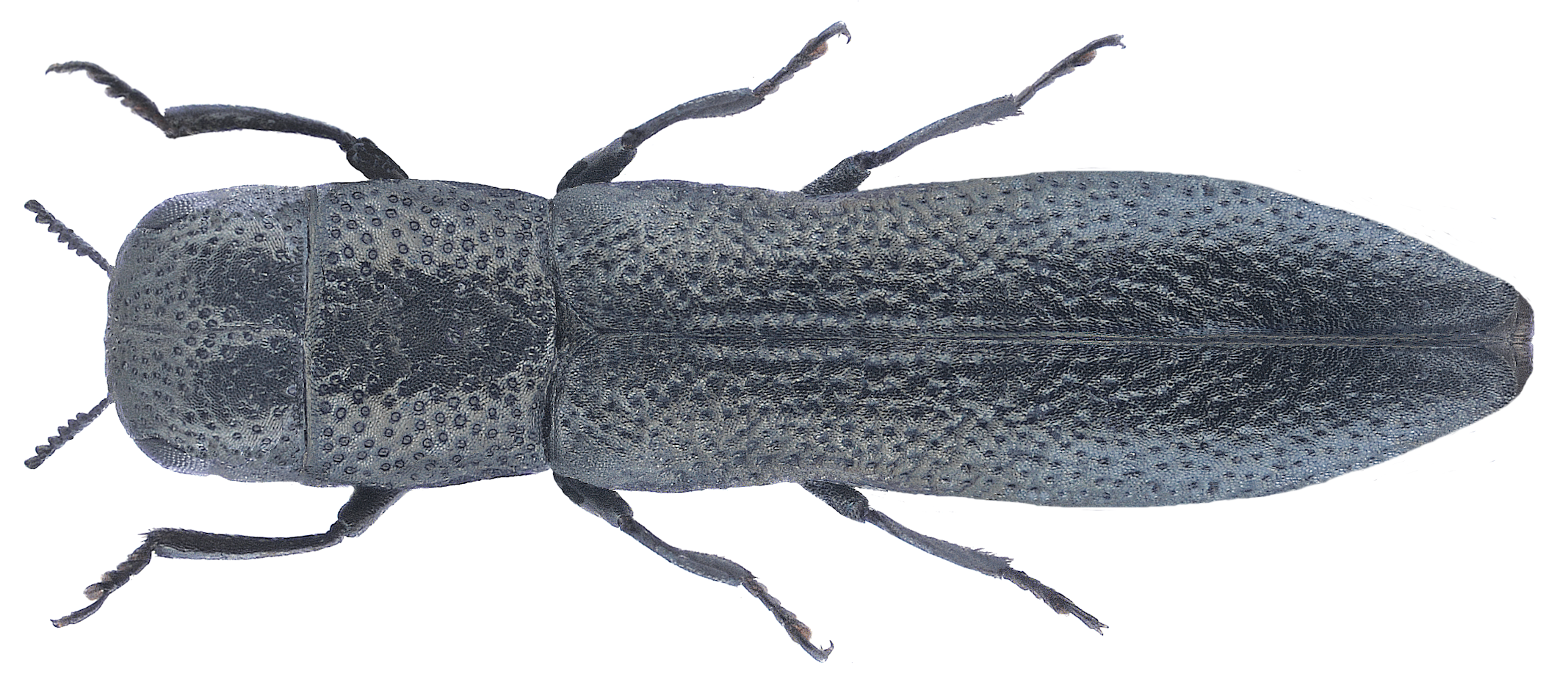
A beetle in the family Buprestidae with an evenly scrobiculate dorsal surface

scrobiculate
Of a surface: bearing numerous superficial, typically rounded, pits
sensu
Latin term meaning "in the sense of".
sequestering
The process of animals accumulating poisonous compounds from the food they are eating in order to become poisonous themselves for their predators. Pyrrolizidine alkaloid sequestration refers to the sequestration of one such class of poisonous compounds.
seta
A stiff chitinous or sclerotised hair or bristle. Also chaeta, cheta
setaceous
- being like or having the nature of a seta or of setae
- setose
setose
bearing, or covered in setae.
setula
Diminutive of seta. A small chitinous hair or bristle.
setulose
bearing, or covered in setulae.
shade
see central shade
spiracle
Respiratory openings on the thorax and abdomen that allow air to enter the trachea.
sporophagy
feeding on mycet spores.
sternite
a ventral sclerite in the exoskeleton of an arthropod.
stigma (plural stigmata)
Prominent cells on the forewings of some moths. Their size, shape and colour can be useful in identifying some species. Also the prominent cell, usually opaque and coloured, near the tip of each wing of the Odonata, on the anterior margin; also called pterostigma.
strigae
Patterns with thin lines.
subcosta
Taxonomically important term used in Diptera identification keys. Part of the schema of wing venation. The second longitudinal wing vein, posterior to the costa. It may reach the costa, fade before the costa or join R1 before it reaches the costa. see commons:File:Neminidae_wing_veins.svg (= auxiliary vein of many authors)
subgenal suture
(Anatomical feature) suture lines below the gena.
symplesiomorphy
a shared ancestral ("primitive") character state that cannot be used to demonstrate the monophyly of a group.
synapomorphy
a shared homologous and derived character state (evolutionary novelty) that demonstrates the monophyly of a group (clade).
synovigenic
a form of reproduction in which the female continues to produce and to mature eggs throughout its life cycle.
tarsus (plural tarsi)
fifth (last) leg segment, the part that touches the walking surface.
tergite
a dorsal sclerite in the exoskeleton of an arthropod.
tergum
the dorsal structure of sclerites in the exoskeleton of most Arthropoda.
termen
The edge of the wing most distant from the body.
terminal and marginal
Along the margin.
thorax
The part of the body that lies between the head and the abdomen. It has three parts - prothorax, mesothorax and metathorax.
tibia
fourth leg segment, between femur and tarsus.
tomentum
a pubescence consisting of soft, entangled hairs pressed close to the surface of the integument.
tornus / tornal area
The posterior corner of the wing.
Trailing edge
The bottom or hind margin of the wing, from wing base to tornus.
trochanter
second leg segment, between coxa and femur.
trophi
The mouthparts of Arthropoda such as insects; typically labrum, mandible, maxilla, labium.
trophus
The singular form of trophi (rarely used).
uncate
hook-like, as in the mouthparts of many fly larvae. (also uncinate)
uncinate
hook-like, as in the mouthparts of many fly larvae. (also uncate)
unguis (plural ungues)
the claws at the tip of most insect pretarsi.
urite
a segment of a recognisably segmentary arthropodal abdomen
urogomphus (plural urogomphi)
paired "horns" at the posterior tip of the abdomen of larvae.
urosternite
plate on the ventral (lower) surface of an abdominal segment in insects. cf. sternite
urotergite
plate on the dorsal (upper) surface of an abdominal segment in insects. cf. tergite
valve
One of several appendages that combine to form the ovipositor of a typical female insect.
valvifer
In female Heteroptera valvifers comprise four blades, one pair on each of abdominal segments 8 and 9. They articulate with the paratergites and bear their corresponding valvulae.
valvula
One of four blades in a female Hemipteran with a laciniate type of ovipositor, that combine to form the ovipositing mechanism.
vein
Hollow structures formed from the coupling of the upper and lower walls of the wing. They provide both rigidity and flexibility to the wing. (See also Comstock-Needham system.)
vertex
(Anatomical feature) The apex of the head, usually containing ocelli.
villose
covered with numerous thick-set, slender projections resembling short hairs.
worker
Insects within social colonies (bees, wasps, ants, and termites) that usually do not reproduce and instead perform most of the colony's tasks.
xylomycetophagy
inhabiting wood and consuming mycetes growing in wood or cultivating them for feeding.
xylophagy
feeding on wood.
zoomycetophagy
feeding on fungus found on other animals.
zoophagy
feeding on animals, and/or animal matter.

== Figures ==
Figure 1 Head
Posterior view

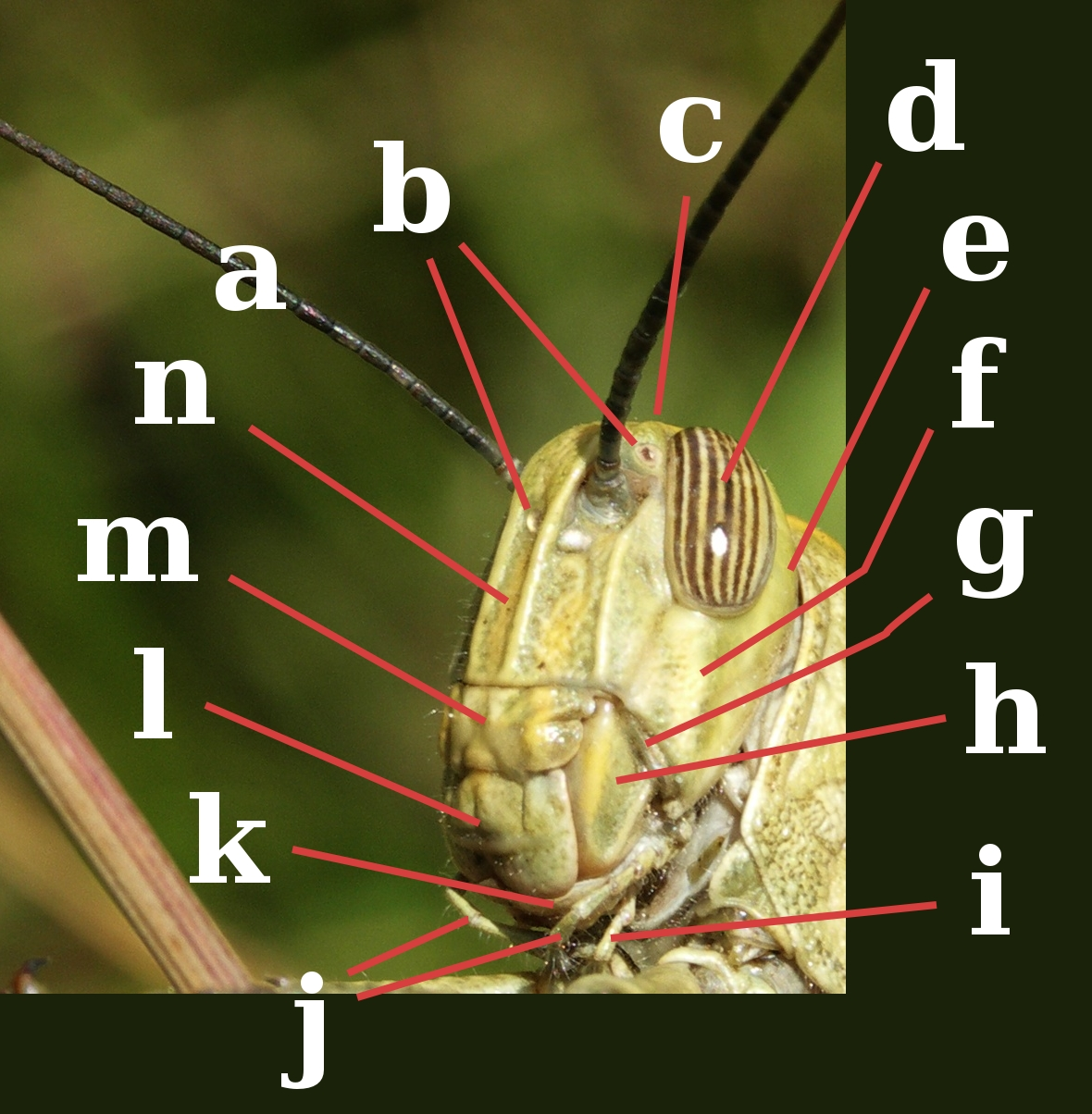
Figure 2 Head
Side view

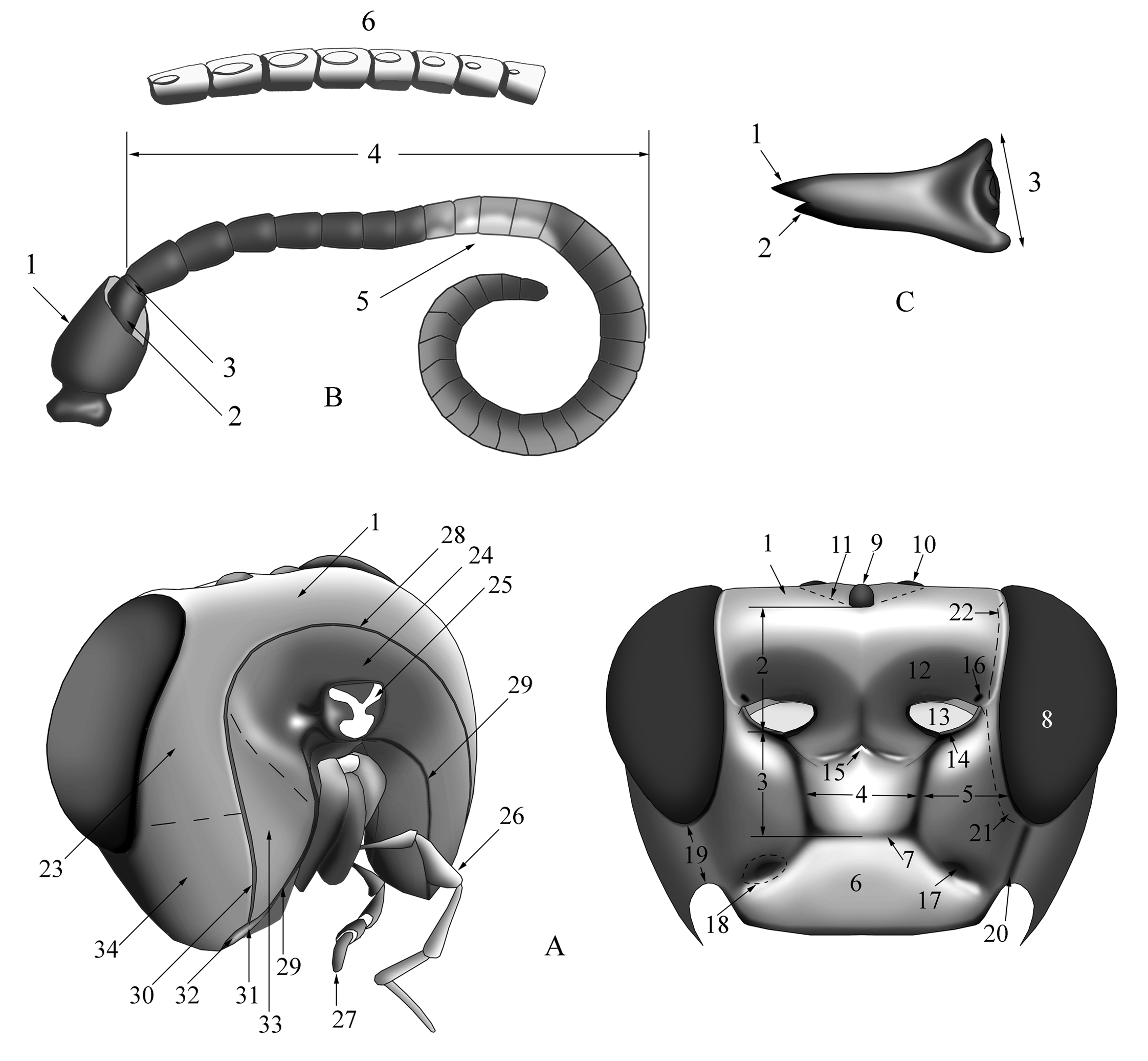
Figure 3 Head
Morphology
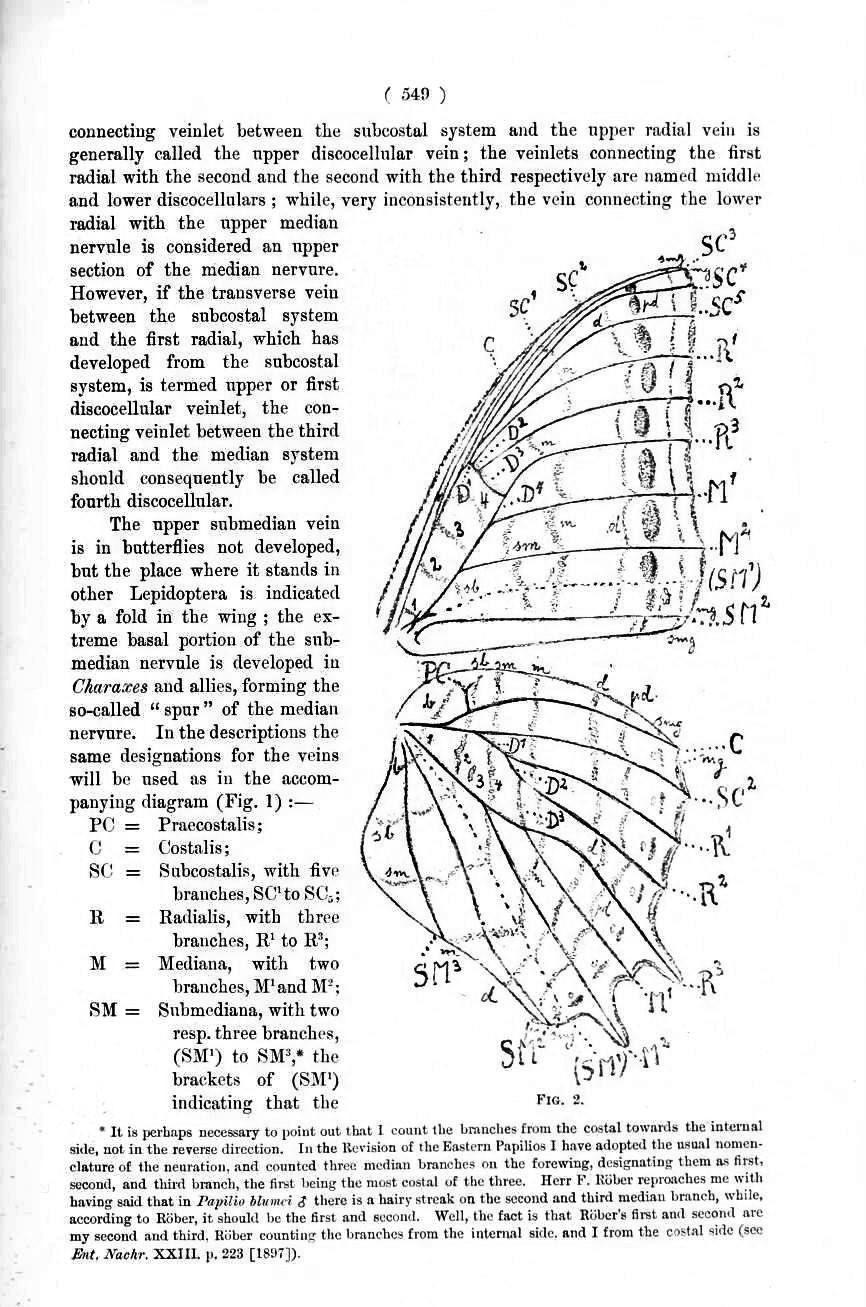
Wing venation Charaxes

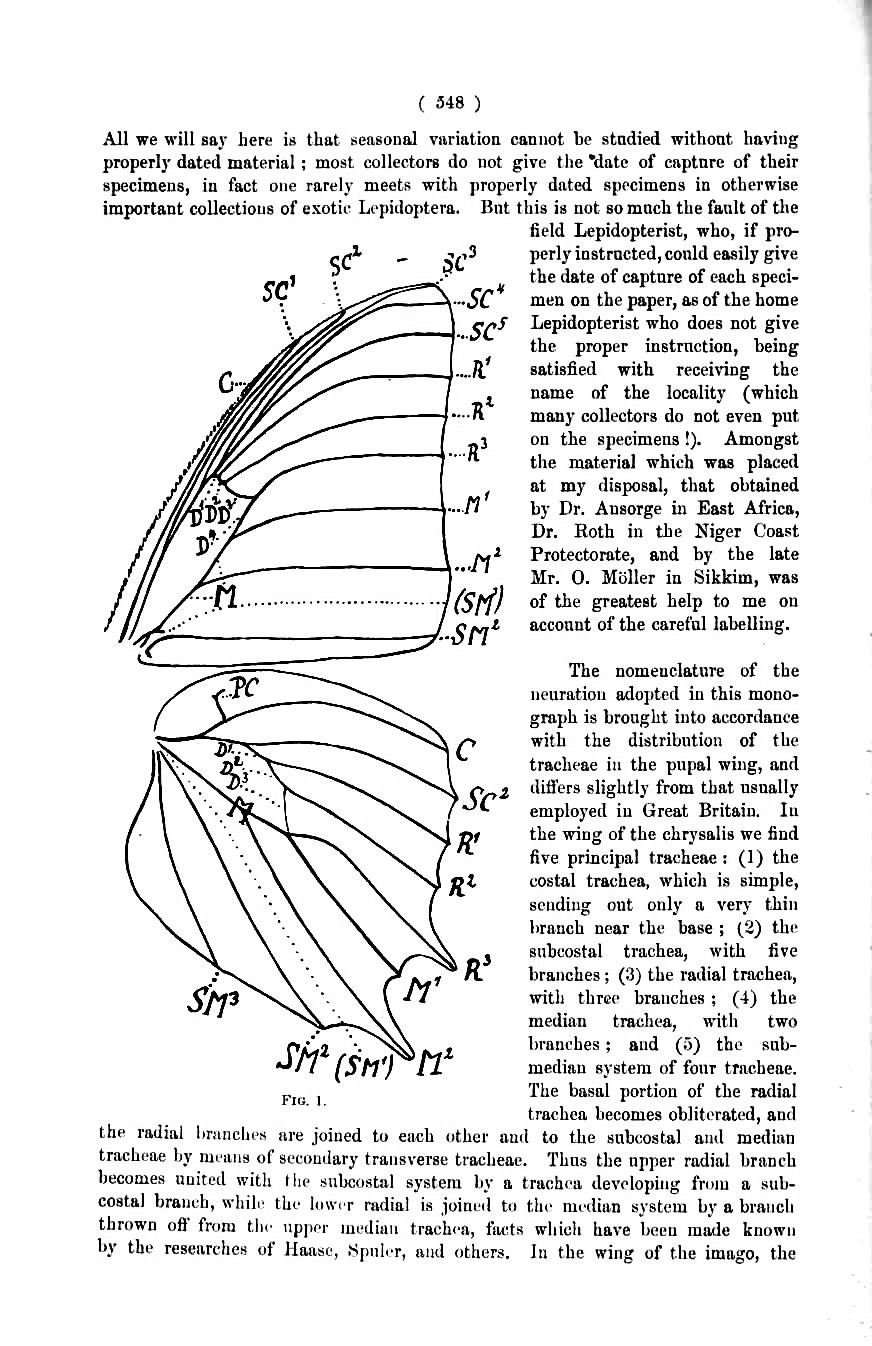
Wing venation Charaxes

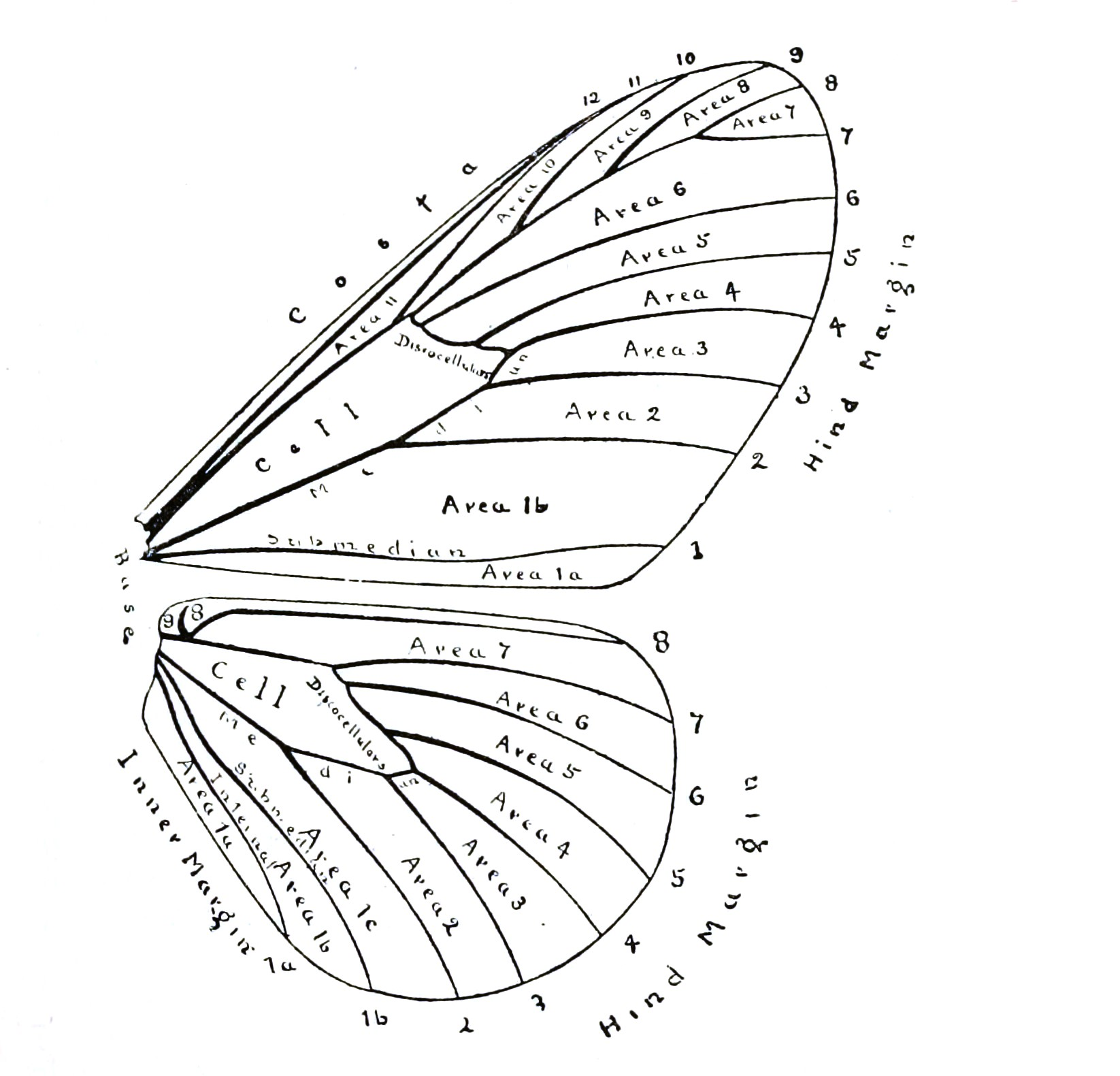
Wing venation Acraea

Wing venation (in German)
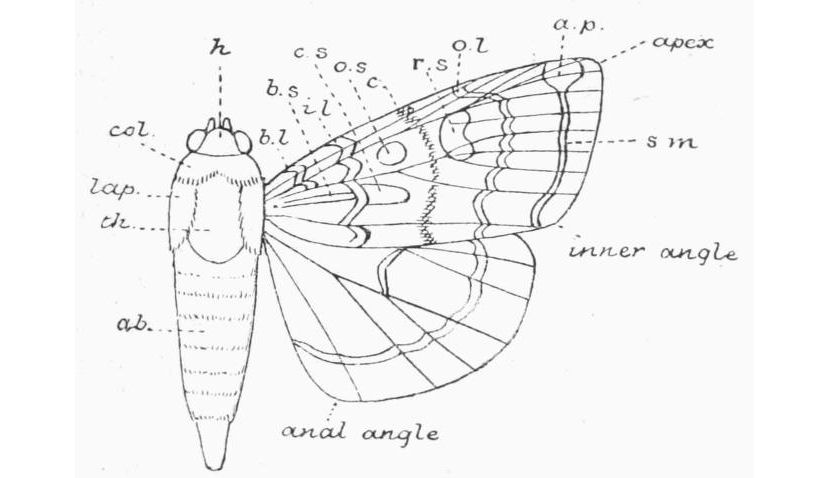
Wing and body of a moth (from South Moths of the British Isles)
Figure 4

Noctuidae Wings
Figure 5

== See also ==
The dictionary definition of thesaurus:insect#See also at Wiktionary

- Anatomical terms of location – Standard terms for unambiguous description of relative placement of body parts
- Butterfly – Group of insects in the order Lepidoptera
- Caterpillar – Larva of a butterfly or moth
- Comstock–Needham system – Naming system for insect wing veins
- External morphology of Lepidoptera – External features of butterflies and moths
- Glossary of ant terms
- Glossary of spider terms
- Glossary of scientific names – List of terms used in biology
- Insect wing – Body part used by insects to fly
- Pupa – Insect life stage
