= Extreme pressure additive =

Extreme pressure additives, or EP additives, are additives for lubricants with a role to decrease wear of the parts of the gears exposed to very high pressures. They are also added to cutting fluids for machining of metals.

Extreme pressure additives are usually used in applications such as gearboxes, while antiwear additives are used with lighter load applications such as hydraulic and automotive engines.

Extreme pressure gear oils perform well over a range of temperatures, speeds and gear sizes to help prevent damage to the gears during starting and stopping of the engine. Unlike antiwear additives, extreme pressure additives are rarely used in motor oils. The sulfur or chlorine compounds contained in them can react with water and combustion byproducts, forming acids that facilitate corrosion of the engine parts and bearings.

Extreme pressure additives typically contain organic sulfur, phosphorus or chlorine compounds, including sulfur-phosphorus and sulfur-phosphorus-boron compounds, which chemically react with the metal surface under high pressure conditions. Under such conditions, small irregularities on the sliding surfaces cause localized flashes of high temperature (300-1000 °C), without significant increase of the average surface temperature. The chemical reaction between the additives and the surface is confined to this area.

Methylenebis(dibutyldithiocarbamate) is an additive in some extreme pressure gear oils, serving as an antioxidant and protecting metal surfaces.

The early extreme pressure additives were based on lead salts of fatty acids ("lead soaps"), "active sulfur" compounds (e.g. thiols and elementary sulfur), and chlorinated compounds. During the 1950s the use of lead soaps was eliminated and replaced by zinc and phosphorus compounds such as zinc dithiophosphate.

Some of the EP additives are:

- Dark inactive sulfurized fat
- Dark active sulfurized fat
- Dark active sulfur hydrocarbon
- Short and medium chain chlorinated alkanes (see chlorinated hydrocarbons and chlorinated paraffins)
- Esters of chlorendic acid
- Polymer esters
- Polysulfides
- Molybdenum compounds

Aliphatic chlorinated hydrocarbons (chlorinated paraffins) are cheap and efficient, however they persist in environment and have strong tendency for bioaccumulation. Therefore, they are being replaced with alternatives. In cutting fluids, their role is largely confined to formulations for forming complex stainless steel parts.

The activity of halogenated hydrocarbons increases with decreasing stability of the carbon-halogen bond. At local contact temperatures ranging between 305-330 °C, the additive thermally decomposes and the reactive halogen atoms form a surface layer of iron halides on the part surface. Eventual failure of the contact point comes when the contact temperature exceeds the melting point of the iron halide layer. Under such conditions, small particles of carbon are generated as well. Some compounds used in lubricant additives are chloroalkanes, trichloromethyl phosphine acids, organic esters of a-acetoxy-b,b,b-trichloroethyl phosphonic acid, trichloromethyl esters of phosphoric acid, trichloromethyl derivates of sulfur, trichloroacetoxy compounds, esters or amine salts of chlorendic acid, 1,2,3,4,7,7-hexachloro-5-dimethylbicyclo[2.2.1]-2-heptene, etc.

Oil-soluble organophosphates, with or without zinc, have excellent high-pressure and antiwear properties, and provide corrosion protection especially in presence of chlorinated hydrocarbons. Zinc dialkyldithiophosphates (ZDDP) start decomposing at 130-170 °C, while the activation temperature of tricresyl phosphate (TCP) typically exceeds 200 °C. Their reaction products form a chemically bonded lubricating film on the surfaces.

Polysulfides serve as carriers of inactive and active sulfur.

Molybdenum compounds decompose under high pressure to form an in-situ deposited layer of molybdenum disulfide. Molybdenum dithiocarbamates are used as additives for greases.

Sulfur containing extreme pressure additives can cause corrosion problems in gears with parts made of bronze, brass and other copper alloy when high temperature environments are encountered.

== See also ==
- Metalworking
