= Gear oil =

Lubricant used in vehicles and machinery

Gear oil is a lubricant made specifically for transmissions, transfer cases, and differentials in automobiles, trucks, and other machinery. It has high viscosity and usually contains organosulfur compounds. Some modern automatic transaxles (integrated transmission and differential) do not use a heavy oil at all but lubricate with the lower-viscosity hydraulic fluid, which is available at pressure within the automatic transmission. Gear oils account for about 20% of the lubricant market.

Most lubricants for manual gearboxes and differentials contain extreme pressure (EP) additives and antiwear additives to cope with the sliding action of hypoid bevel gears. Typical additives include dithiocarbamate derivatives and sulfur-treated organic compounds ("sulfurized hydrocarbons").

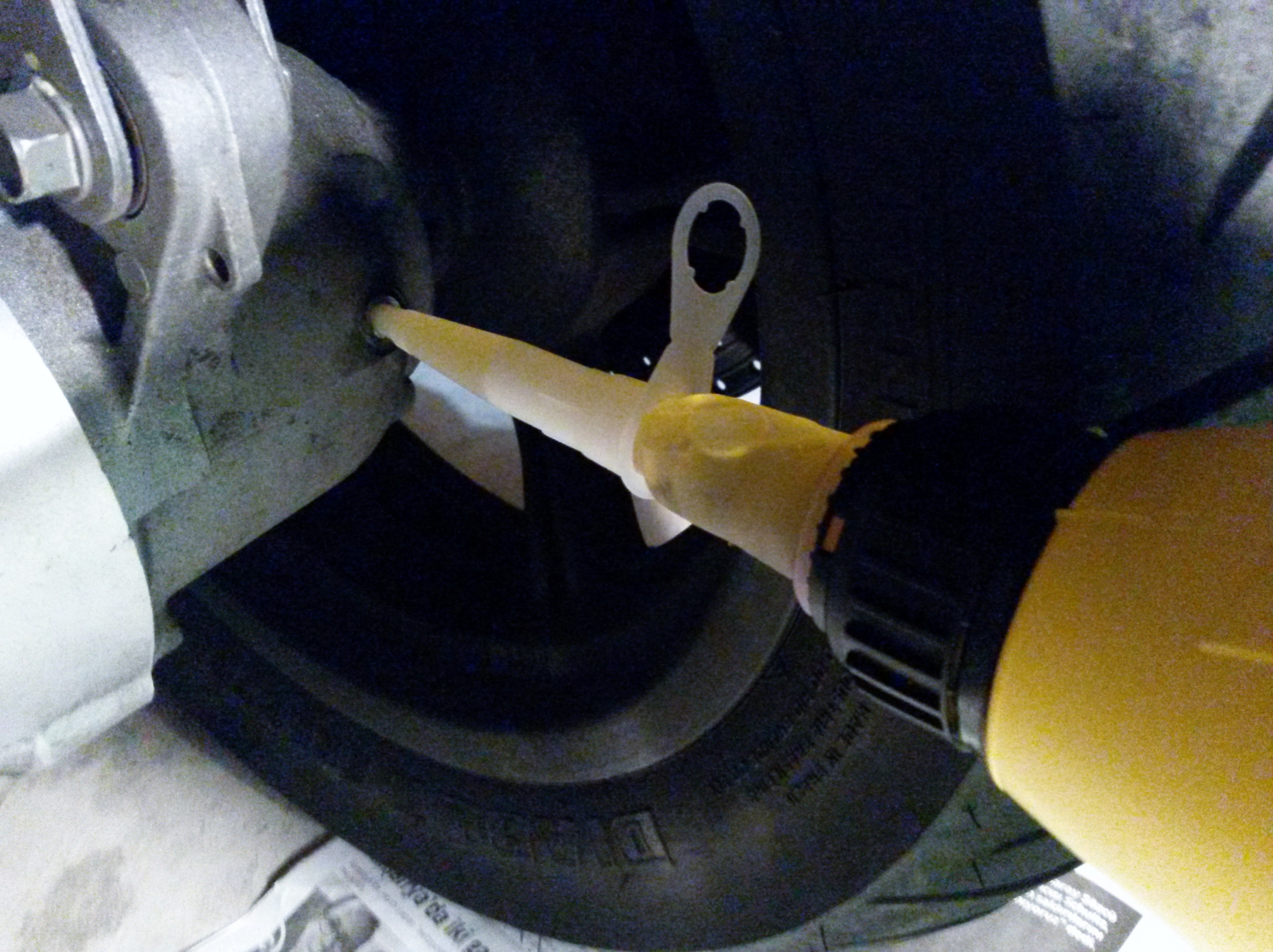
Gear oil being added to the final reduction gears in a scooter.

EP additives which contain phosphorus/sulfur compounds are corrosive to yellow metals such as the copper and/or brass used in bushings and synchronizers, unless properly buffered; the GL-1 class of gear oils does not contain any EP additives and thus used to be the choice in applications which contain parts made of yellow metals.

GL-5 is not necessarily backward-compatible in synchro-mesh transmissions which are designed for a GL-4 oil: GL-5 has a lower coefficient of friction due to the higher concentration of EP additives over GL-4, and thus such transmissions running on it cannot engage as effectively, unless a specialized friction modifier has been included within the oil's additive package; synchro-mesh compatibility is usually explicitly stated and such oils are often known in the trade as TDL (Total Drive Line) oils.

== API ratings ==
Gearbox oils are classified by the American Petroleum Institute using GL ratings. The higher an oil's GL-rating, the more pressure can be sustained without any metal-to-metal contact taking place between transmission components. Separate differentials usually have higher pressure between metal parts than gearboxes and therefore need higher GL-rating. For example, most modern gearboxes require a GL-4 oil, and separate differentials (where fitted) require a GL-5 oil.

While they take the same form, the viscosity grades for gear oils are on a different scale than the viscosity grades for an engine oil. The viscometrics for gear oils are standardized in SAE J306. Multigrade gear oils are becoming more common; while gear oil does not reach the temperatures of motor oil, it does warm up appreciably as the car is driven, due mostly to shear friction (with a small amount of heat conduction through the bellhousing from the engine block).

Fully synthetic gear oils are also used in many vehicles, and have a greater resistance to shear breakdown than mineral oils.

API Category GL-1 (inactive) designates the type of service characteristic of manual transmissions operating under such mild conditions of low unit pressures and minimum sliding velocities, that untreated oil may be used satisfactorily. Oxidation and rust inhibitors, defoamers and pour depressants may be used to improve the characteristics of lubricants intended for this service. Friction modifiers and extreme pressure additives shall not be used.

API Category GL-2 (inactive) designates the type of service characteristic of automotive type worm-gear axles operating under such conditions of load, temperature and sliding velocities, that lubricants satisfactory for API GL-1 service will not suffice.

API Category GL-3 (inactive) designates the type of service characteristic of manual transmissions and spiral-bevel axles operating under mild to moderate to severe conditions of speed and load. These service conditions require a lubricant having load-carrying capacities greater than those that will satisfy APL GL-1 service, but below the requirements of lubricants satisfying the API GL-4 service, with wide operation ranges and temperature differences in the vicinity of viscosity.

API Category GL-4 designates the type of service characteristic of spiral-bevel and hypoid gears in automotive axles operated under moderate speeds and loads. These oils may be used in selected manual transmission and transaxle applications.

API Category GL-5 designates the type of service characteristic of gears, particularly hypoids in automotive axles under high-speed and/or low-speed, high-torque conditions. Lubricants qualified under U.S. Military specification MIL-L-2105D (formerly MIL-L-2015C), MIL-PRF-2105E and SAE J2360 satisfy the requirements of the API GL-5 service designation.

API Category GL-6 (inactive) designates the type of service characteristic of gears designed with a very high pinion offset. Such designs typically require (gear) score protection in excess of that provided by API GL-5 gear oils. The original API GL-6 test equipment is obsolete.

API Category MT-1 designates lubricants intended for non-synchronized manual transmissions used in buses and heavy-duty trucks. Lubricants meeting API MT-1 provide protection against the combination of thermal degradation, component wear, and oil seal deterioration which is not provided by lubricants meeting only the requirements of API GL-4 and API GL-5.

MIL-PRF-2105E this specification released in 1995 combines the performance requirements of its predecessor (MIL-L-2105D) and API MT-1. MIL-PRF-2105E maintains all existing chemical/physical requirements, stationary axle test requirements, field test requirements and data review by the Lubricants Review Institute that were required under MIL-L-2105D. It also adds the stringent oil seal compatibility and thermal durability test requirements under API MT-1. MIL-PRF-2105E has been re-written as SAE Standard J2360. SAE J2360 standard is a new global quality standard that defines a level of performance equivalent to that defined by MIL-PRF-2105E, a U.S. military standard for approval that was not available to oil blenders in all parts of the world. It includes all of the most recent axle and transmission testing requirements identified in API GL-5, API MT-1, and MIL-PRF-2105E including the need to demonstrate proof-of-performance through rigorous field testing.
