= Chlorendic acid =

Names
- IUPAC name 1,4,5,6,7,7-hexachlorobicyclo[2.2.1]-hept-5-ene-2,3-dicarboxylic acid
- Other names Chlorendic acid, HET acid, hexachloroendomethylenetetrahydrophthalic acid

Identifiers
CAS Number	115-28-6
3D model (JSmol)	Interactive image
ChEBI	CHEBI:76603
ChemSpider	7968
ECHA InfoCard	100.003.708
KEGG	C19204
PubChem CID	8266
UNII	IAC1H0N39L
CompTox Dashboard (EPA)	DTXSID2020268
- InChI: InChI=1S/C9H4Cl6O4/c10-3-4(11)8(13)2(6(18)19)1(5(16)17)7(3,12)9(8,14)15/h1-2H,(H,16,17)(H,18,19) Key: DJKGDNKYTKCJKD-UHFFFAOYSA-N
- SMILES: C1(C(C2(C(=C(C1(C2(Cl)Cl)Cl)Cl)Cl)Cl)C(=O)O)C(=O)O

Properties
Chemical formula	C_{9}H_{4}Cl_{6}O_{4}
Molar mass	388.84366
Melting point	232 °C (450 °F; 505 K)
- Except where otherwise noted, data are given for materials in their standard state (at 25 °C [77 °F], 100 kPa). verify (what is ?) Infobox references

Chlorendic acid, or 1,4,5,6,7,7-hexachlorobicyclo[2.2.1]-hept-5-ene-2,3-dicarboxylic acid, is a chlorinated carboxylic acid used in the synthesis of some flame retardants and polymers. It is a common breakdown product of several organochlorine insecticides.

== Properties and identification ==
Chlorendic acid is a white crystalline material with chemical formula C_{9}H_{4}Cl_{6}O_{4}. It is also called HET acid, hexachloroendomethylenetetrahydrophthalic acid, 1,4,5,6,7,7-hexachloro-5-norbornene-2,3-dicarboxylic acid, and 1,4,5,6,7,7 hexachlorobicyclo[2.2.1]-5-heptene-2,3-dicarboxylic acid.

It is produced both as acid and as its anhydride. The anhydride has CAS number 115-27-5.

Chlorendic acid is slightly soluble in water and nonpolar organic solvents (e.g. benzene, hexane, carbon tetrachloride). It is easily soluble in slightly polar organic solvents (ethanol, methanol, acetone). When heated, it loses water at 200 °C, forming an anhydride with melting point of 230–235 °C. When subject to pyrolysis, it decomposes to hydrochloric acid and various chlorinated compounds. It is resistant to hydrolytic dechlorination. It readily forms salts with metals, and esters.

== Chemistry and uses ==
Chlorendic acid is industrially produced in high volumes by the Diels-Alder reaction. It is used as an intermediate in synthesis of unsaturated flame-retardant polyester resins and plasticizers, and as a finishing flame-retardant treatment for wool. A major use is in the production of fiberglass-reinforced resins for chemical-industry equipment. It can be used to make alkyd resins for use in special inks and paints. It is used as a hardening agent in epoxy resins used in the manufacture of printed circuit boards. When reacted with nonhalogenated glycols, it forms halogenated polyols that can be used as flame retardants in polyurethane foams. It is also used for producing dibutyl chlorendate and dimethyl chlorendate, which are used as reactive flame retardants in plastics. In limited amounts, it is used as an additive in acrylonitrile butadiene styrene copolymer.

Esters and amine salts of chlorendic acid are used as extreme pressure additives in synthetic lubricants.

When used in polymers, whether as a curing agent or as a flame retardant, it bonds covalently to the polymer matrix, which reduces its leaching to the environment. It may, however, be released when such materials are subjected to hydrolysis, and it can be formed by oxidation of chlorinated cyclodiene insecticides (e.g. endosulfan, chlordane, heptachlor, aldrin, dieldrin, endrin, and isodrin). Its half-life in soil is 140–280 days.

In Europe, 80% of chlorendic acid is used in the production of flame-resistant composites for building and transportation, while the rest is used in materials for corrosion-resistant fluid-storage equipment. In the USA, Latin America, and Asia, 20-30% is used in flame-retardant applications and the rest is used in corrosion-resistant plastics.
