= Total acid number =

Quality measurement of crude oil

The total acid number (TAN) is a measurement of acidity that is determined by the amount of potassium hydroxide in milligrams that is needed to neutralize the acids in one gram of oil. It is an important quality measurement of crude oil.

The TAN value indicates to the crude oil refinery the potential of corrosion problems. It is usually the naphthenic acids in the crude oil that cause corrosion problems. This type of corrosion is referred to as naphthenic acid corrosion (NAC).

TAN values may also be useful in other industries where oils are used as lubricants to determine oxidation and the subsequent corrosion risk to machinery.

TAN value can be deduced by various methods, including

- Potentiometric titration: The sample is normally dissolved in toluene and propanol with a little water and titrated with alcoholic potassium hydroxide (if sample is acidic). A glass electrode and reference electrode is immersed in the sample and connected to a voltmeter/potentiometer. The meter reading (in millivolts) is plotted against the volume of titrant. The end point is taken at the distinct inflection of the resulting titration curve corresponding to the basic buffer solution.
- Color indicating titration: An appropriate pH color indicator e.g. phenolphthalein, is used. Titrant is added to the sample by means of a burette. The volume of titrant used to cause a permanent color change in the sample is recorded and used to calculate the TAN value.
- Spectroscopic methods: as with many chemical parameters, spectroscopy can be used to make fast, accurate measurements once calibrated by a reference method. Mid and near infrared spectroscopy are most commonly used for this purpose. Spectroscopic methods are valuable as they can also be used to simultaneously measure a number of other parameters and do away with the need for wet chemistry.

== See also ==
- Total base number
