= Dimethyl chlorendate =

Names
- Preferred IUPAC name Dimethyl (1R,2R,3S,4S)-1,4,5,6,7,7-hexachlorobicyclo[2.2.1]hept-5-ene-2,3-dicarboxylate
- Other names Dimethyl hexachloroendomethylenetetrahydrophthalate; 1,4,5,6,7,7-Hexachlorobicyclo(2.2.1)hept-5-ene-2,3-dicarboxylic acid dimethyl ester; NSC12446

Identifiers
CAS Number	1773-89-3
3D model (JSmol)	Interactive image
ChemSpider	24751856
ECHA InfoCard	100.015.639
EC Number	217-202-1
PubChem CID	164881
UNII	2T60Q2D44E
CompTox Dashboard (EPA)	DTXSID3040306
- InChI: InChI=1S/C11H8Cl6O4/c1-20-7(18)3-4(8(19)21-2)10(15)6(13)5(12)9(3,14)11(10,16)17/h3-4H,1-2H3/t3-,4+,9-,10+ Key: MDHHRPHYYRMIPH-OWEGFZGBSA-N
- SMILES: COC(=O)[C@H]1[C@H]([C@@]2(C(=C([C@]1(C2(Cl)Cl)Cl)Cl)Cl)Cl)C(=O)OC

Properties
Chemical formula	C_{11}H_{8}Cl_{6}O_{4}
Molar mass	416.88 g·mol^{−1}
Density	1.71 g/cm^{3}
Boiling point	428.4 °C (803.1 °F; 701.5 K)

Hazards
Flash point	162.8 °C (325.0 °F; 435.9 K)
- Except where otherwise noted, data are given for materials in their standard state (at 25 °C [77 °F], 100 kPa). verify (what is ?) Infobox references

Dimethyl chlorendate is a chlorendic acid used as a flame retardant additive.
