= C12H8Cl6O =

Molecular formula

The molecular formula C_{12}H_{8}Cl_{6}O (molar mass: 380.91 g/mol, exact mass: 377.8706 u) may refer to:

- Dieldrin
- Endrin
