= Friction modifier =

Lubricant additive to reduce friction and wear

Friction modifiers are added to lubricants in order to reduce friction and wear in machine components. They are particularly important in the boundary lubrication regime, where they can prevent solid surfaces from coming into direct contact, substantially reducing friction and wear.

Several classes of friction modifier additives exist, the main examples being organic friction modifiers (OFMs), oil-soluble organo-molybdenum additives, functionalized polymers, and dispersed nanoparticles.

- OFMs are amphiphilic surfactants, such as fatty acids, often derived from fats and vegetable oils. OFMs are important additives in modern engine oils and are also employed in fuels. They adsorb on metal surfaces and self-assemble to form incompressible monolayers which prevent asperity contact and reduce friction and wear.
- Organo-molybdenum compounds, were initially developed as antiwear additives but were later recognized to be very effective in reducing boundary friction. They are currently used in many engine oils and, more recently, in gear oils. They reduce friction by forming two-dimensional molybdenum disulphide layers on rubbing surfaces.
- Functionalized polymers, which can be tailored to adsorb specifically on polar surfaces, have been shown to markedly reduce friction and wear.
- Dispersed nanoparticles have been shown to reduce boundary friction, but they have not yet found widespread employment in industrial applications.

Reduction of frictional losses and through more efficient lubrication is a key target in order to reduce carbon dioxide emissions. One approach has been to progressively reduce lubricant viscosity to minimize hydrodynamic shear, churning and pumping losses. However, this means that an increased number of components operate under boundary lubrication conditions. This has led to a resurgence in interest in friction modifier additives, particularly OFMs. For example, recent tribology experiments and molecular dynamics simulations have given new insights into their behaviour under boundary lubrication conditions.

== See also ==
- Oil additive – Chemicals that improve oil performance
- Lubricant – Substance introduced to reduce friction between surfaces in mutual contact
- Tribology – Science of rubbing surfaces
