= Hexadrin =

Hexadrin may refer to:

- Cyclophosphamide - a drug used to treat cancer and autoimmune disease
- Endrin - an organochloride insecticide
