= SAE J306 =

SAE J306 is a standard that defines the viscometric properties of automotive gear oils. It is maintained by SAE International. Key parameters for this standard are the kinematic viscosity of the gear oil, the maximum temperature at which the oil has a viscosity of 150,000 cP, and a measure of its shear stability through the KRL test.
