= Antiwear additive =

Additives for lubricants to prevent metal-to-metal contact

AW additives, or antiwear additives, are additives for lubricants to prevent metal-to-metal contact between parts of gears.

EP additives are used in applications such as gearboxes, while AW additives are used with lighter loads such as bushings.

== Details ==
Some popular AW additives are:

- zinc dithiophosphate (ZDP)
- zinc dialkyl dithio phosphate (ZDDP), probably the most widely used in formulated engine oils, also acts as a corrosion inhibitor and antioxidant
- Tricresyl phosphate (TCP), used for high-temperature operation, often used as an AW and EP additive in turbine engine lubricants, and also in some crankcase oils and hydraulic fluids
- Halocarbons (chlorinated paraffins), for extreme pressure operations
- Glycerol mono oleate
- Stearic acid, adhering to surfaces via reversible adsorption process under 150 °C, which limits its use to mild contact conditions.

Some formulations use colloidal PTFE (Teflon), but its efficiency is controversial.

Many AW additives function as EP additives, for example organophosphates or sulfur compounds. The mechanism of function of TCP and ZDDP is explained in EP additives.

Under extreme pressure conditions, the performance of AW additives becomes insufficient and designated EP additives are required.

== See also ==
- Extreme pressure additive – lubricant additive
- Oil additive – Chemical compounds that improve the lubricant performance of base oil
