= Phytotoxicity =

Toxic effect by a compound on plant growth

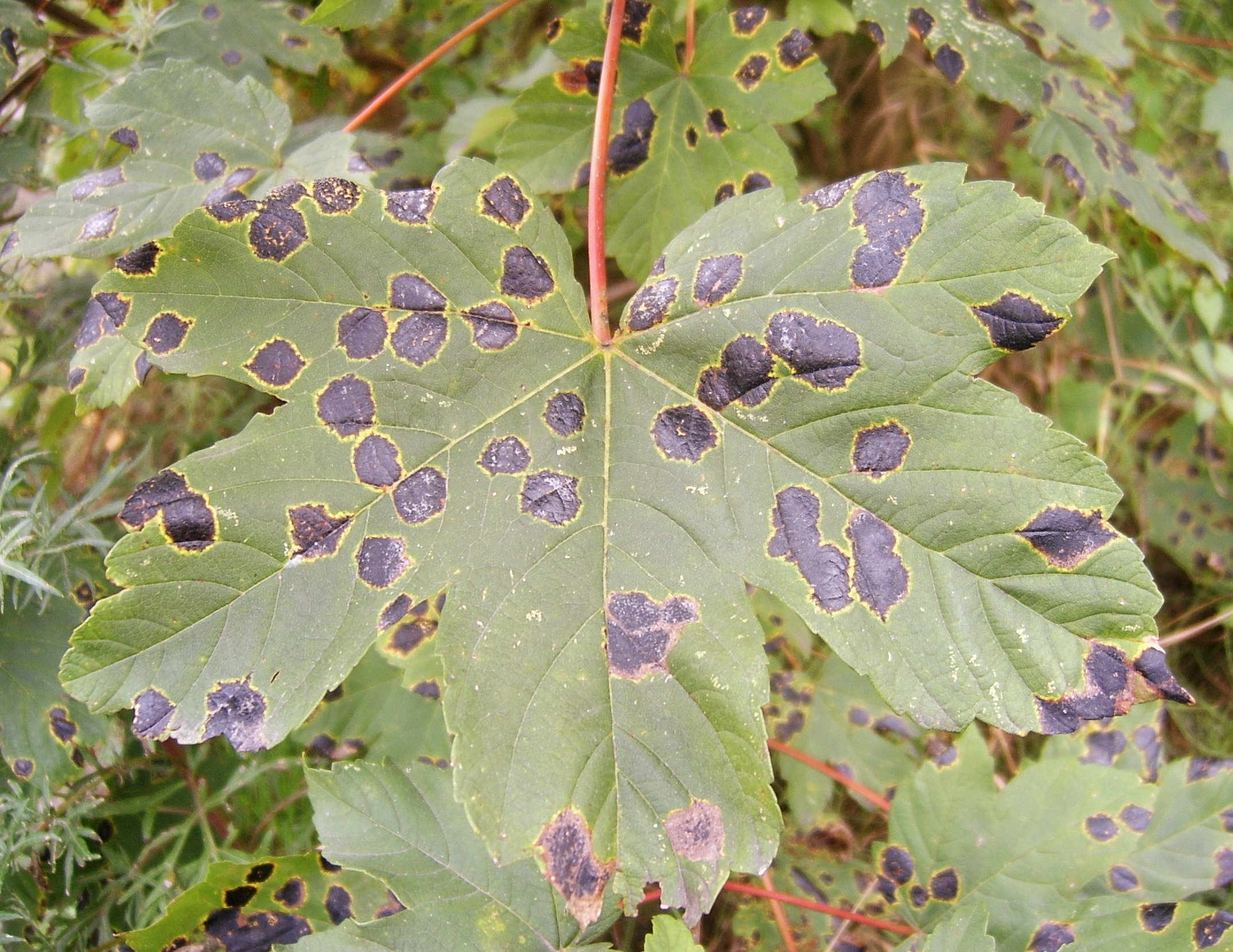
Phytotoxic effects of the fungus Rhytisma acerinum on a Maple leaf.

Phytotoxicity describes any adverse effects on plant growth, physiology, or metabolism caused by a chemical substance, such as high levels of fertilizers, herbicides, heavy metals, or nanoparticles. General phytotoxic effects include altered plant metabolism, growth inhibition, or plant death. Changes to plant metabolism and growth are the result of disrupted physiological functioning, including inhibition of photosynthesis, water and nutrient uptake, cell division, or seed germination.

== Fertilizers ==
High concentrations of mineral salts in solution within the plant growing medium can result in phytotoxicity, commonly caused by excessive application of fertilizers. For example, urea is used in agriculture as a nitrogenous fertilizer. However, if too much is applied, phytotoxic effects can result from urea toxicity directly or ammonia production from hydrolysis of urea. Organic fertilizers, such as compost, also have the potential to be phytotoxic if not sufficiently humified, as intermediate products of this process are harmful to plant growth.

== Herbicides ==
Herbicides are designed and used to control unwanted plants such as agricultural weeds. However, the use of herbicides can cause phytotoxic effects on non-targeted plants through wind-blown spray drift or from the use of herbicide-contaminated material (such as straw or manure) being applied to the soil. Herbicides can also cause phytotoxicity in crops if applied incorrectly, in the wrong stage of crop growth, or in excess. The phytotoxic effects of herbicides are an important subject of study in the field of ecotoxicology.

== Heavy Metals ==
Heavy metals are high-density metallic compounds which are poisonous to plants at low concentrations, although toxicity depends on plant species, specific metal and its chemical form, and soil properties. The most relevant heavy metals contributing to phytotoxicity in crops are silver (Ag), arsenic (As), cadmium (Cd), cobalt (Co), chromium (Cr), iron (Fe), nickel (Ni), lead (Pb), and zinc (Zn). Of these, Co, Cu, Fe, Ni, and Zn are trace elements required in small amounts for enzyme and redox reactions essential in plant development. However, past a certain threshold they become toxic. The other heavy metals listed are considered toxic at any concentration and can bioaccumulate, posing a health hazard to humans if consumed.

Heavy metal contamination occurs from both natural and anthropogenic sources. The most notable natural source of heavy metals is rock outcroppings, although volcanic eruptions can release large amounts of toxic material. Significant anthropogenic sources include mining and smelting operations and organic and inorganic fertilizer application.

== Nanoparticles ==
Nanotechnology is a rapidly growing industry with many applications, including drug delivery, biomedicines, and electronics. As a result, manufactured nanoparticles, with sizes less than 100 nm, are released into the environment. Plant uptake and bioaccumulation of these nanoparticles can cause plant growth enhancement or phytotoxic effects, depending on plant species and nanoparticle concentration.
