= Lubricity =

Degree to which a lubricant reduces friction or wear

Lubricity is the measure of the reduction in friction and wear by a lubricant. The study of lubrication and wear mechanisms is called tribology.

== Measurement ==
The lubricity of a substance is not a material property, and cannot be measured directly. Tests are performed to quantify a lubricant's performance for a specific system. This is often done by determining how much wear is caused to a surface by a given wear-inducing object in a given amount of time. Other factors such as surface size, temperature, and pressure are also specified. For two fluids with the same viscosity, the one that results in a smaller wear scar is considered to have higher lubricity. For this reason, lubricity is also termed a substance's anti-wear property.

Examples of tribometer test setups include "Ball-on-cylinder" and "Ball-on-three-discs" tests.

== In diesel engines ==
In a modern diesel engine, the fuel is part of the engine lubrication process. Diesel fuel naturally contains compounds that provide lubricity, but because of regulations in many countries (such as the US and the EU countries), sulfur must be removed from the fuel before it can be sold. The hydrotreatment of diesel fuel to remove sulfur also removes the compounds that provide lubricity. Reformulated diesel fuel that does not have biodiesel added has a lower lubricity and requires lubricity improving additives to prevent excessive engine wear.

== See also ==
- Boundary lubrication
- Superlubricity
- Tribology
