= Total base number =

Measurement in chemistry

Base number (BN) is a measurement of basicity that is expressed in terms of the number of milligrams of potassium hydroxide per gram of oil sample (mg KOH/g). BN is an important measurement in petroleum products, and the value varies depending on its application. BN generally ranges from 6–8 mg KOH/g in modern lubricants, 7–10 mg KOH/g for general internal combustion engine use and 10–15 mg KOH/g for diesel engine operations. BN is typically higher for marine grade lubricants, approximately 15-80 mg KOH/g, as the higher BN values are designed to increase the operating period under harsh operating conditions, before the lubricant requires replacement.

== Oil additives ==
An oil formulation consists of the base or stock oil and oil additives. Most oil formulations contain basic additives and detergents, designed to react with and neutralise acids, preventing damage to engine parts, including corrosion of metal surfaces.

== Potentiometric determination ==
Although IP Standard test methods exist, the more common methods for BN are ASTM standardised, such as the potentiometric titration for fresh oils (Test method BN ASTM D2896). A sample is typically dissolved in a pre-mixed solvent of chlorobenzene and acetic acid and titrated with standardised perchloric acid in glacial acetic acid for fresh oil samples. The end point is detected using a glass electrode which is immersed in an aqueous solution containing the sample, and connected to a voltmeter/potentiometer. This causes an ion exchange in the outer solvated layer at the glass membrane, so a change in potential is generated which can be measured by the electrode. When the end point of the chemical reaction is reached, which is shown by an inflection point on the titration curve using a specified detection system, the amount of titrant required is used to generate a result which is reported in milligrams of potassium hydroxide equivalent per gram of sample (mg of KOH/g). Potentiometric titration for used oils (Test method BN ASTM D4739): a sample is dissolved in a solvent mixture of Toluene/ Propan-2-ol /Chloroform with 0.5% deionised water and then titrated with standardised alcoholic hydrochloric acid. The detection system is equivalent to the fresh oil method. The used oil method uses a less polar solvent and weaker titrant, which will not dissolve the wear metals produced during operation, hence it is more suitable to analyse used oils.

== Photometric determination ==
A colour-indicator titration, for example using test method ASTM D974, can be carried out to indicate relative changes that occur in an oil sample during its use under oxidising conditions. A sample is dissolved in a solvent mixture of Toluene/ Propan-2-ol with 0.5% deionised water. A methyl orange indicator is added and the solution is titrated using alcoholic potassium hydroxide. The end point is indicated by a colour change from orange to green.

== Thermometric determination ==
In thermometric titrations, a constant addition rate of titrant equates to a constant amount of heat being given out or consumed, and hence a more or less constant temperature change up to the endpoint. In a titration, the titrant reacts with the analyte in the sample either exothermically or endothermically. The thermoprobe measures the temperature of the titrating solution. When all of the analyte in the sample has reacted with the titrant, the temperature of the solution will change, and the endpoint of the titration is revealed by an inflection in the temperature curve.

An appropriate aliquot of the sample is pipetted directly into the titration vessel, and isobutyl vinyl ether and toluene solvent are added. The solution is then titrated with trifluoro methane sulfonic acid (TFMSA) to a single thermometric endpoint.

== Conductometric determination ==
A conductometric titration method can also be used for the determination of the base number of petroleum products. A conductivity sensor is used to measure the conductivity of the analyte which allows the endpoint to be detected. It is suitable for both new and used products having base numbers from 1 mg to 40 mg KOH/g. A sample is dissolved in a solvent mixture of Toluene/ Propan-2-ol with 0.5% deionised water. A conductivity cell is placed in the titration vessel. The sample solution is titrated with alcoholic hydrochloric acid.

== Spectroscopic determination ==
Mid-FTIR spectroscopy can be used to rapidly and quantitatively determine the BN of hydrocarbon lubricating oils by spectroscopically measuring the carboxylate (COO-) functional group of the salt produced when trifluoroacetic acid (TFA) reacts with basic constituents present in an oil sample.

== See also ==
- Acid number
