= Methylenebis(dibutyldithiocarbamate) =

Names
- Preferred IUPAC name Methylene bis(dibutylcarbamodithioate)
- Other names Methylene Dibutyldithiocarbamate

Identifiers
CAS Number	10254-57-6
3D model (JSmol)	Interactive image
ChemSpider	74450
EC Number	233-593-1
PubChem CID	82496
UNII	8074XM58IX
- InChI: InChI=1S/C19H38N2S4/c1-5-9-13-20(14-10-6-2)18(22)24-17-25-19(23)21(15-11-7-3)16-12-8-4/h5-17H2,1-4H3 Key: LMODBLQHQHXPEI-UHFFFAOYSA-N
- SMILES: CCCCN(CCCC)C(=S)SCSC(=S)N(CCCC)CCCC

Properties
Chemical formula	C_{19}H_{38}N_{2}S_{4}
Molar mass	422.77 g·mol^{−1}

Hazards
- GHS labelling
Pictograms	(GHS09: Environmental hazard)
Hazard statements	H413
Precautionary statements	P273, P501
- Except where otherwise noted, data are given for materials in their standard state (at 25 °C [77 °F], 100 kPa). Infobox references

Methylenebis(dibutyldithiocarbamate) is the organosulfur compound with the formula CH_{2}(SC(S)NBu_{2})_{2} (Bu = C4H9). It is a derivative of dibutyldithiocarbamate that is used as an additive to various lubricants, both as an antioxidant and a preservative for metal surfaces. It is prepared by alkylation of the dithiocarbamate with dichloromethane. Although it is described as colored, simple esters of dithiocarbamate are typically colorless.
