= Isodrin =

Isodrin may refer to either of two chemical compounds:

- Isodrin, an organochlorine insecticide which is an isomer of aldrin
- Pholedrine (4-HMA), a methylamphetamine derivative
