= Chlorinated paraffins =

Class of chemical compounds

Structure of 2,3,4,5,6,8-hexachlorodecane, an example of a short-chained chlorinated paraffin (61% Cl by weight)

Structure of 2,5,6,7,8,11,15-heptachloroheptadecane, an example of a medium-chain chlorinated paraffin (52% Cl by weight)

Chlorinated paraffins (CPs) are complex mixtures of polychlorinated n-alkanes (paraffin wax). The chlorination degree of CPs can vary between 30 and 70 wt%. CPs are subdivided according to their carbon chain length into short-chain CPs (SCCPs, C_{10−13}), medium-chain CPs (MCCPs, C_{14−17}) and long-chain CPs (LCCPs, C_{>17}). Depending on chain length and chlorine content, CPs are colorless or yellowish liquids or solids.

== Production ==
Chlorinated paraffins are synthesized by reaction of chlorine gas with unbranched paraffin fractions (<2 % isoparaffins, <100 ppm aromatics) at a temperature of 80–100 °C (176–212 °F). The radical substitution may be promoted by UV-light.

C_{x}H_{(2x+2)} + y Cl_{2} → C_{x}H_{(2x−y+2)}Cl_{y} + y HCl

When the desired degree of chlorination is achieved, residues of hydrochloric acid and chlorine are blown off with nitrogen. Epoxidized vegetable oil, glycidyl ether or organophosphorous compounds may be added to the final product for improved stability at high temperatures.

Commercial products have been classified as substances of unknown or variable composition. CPs are complex mixtures of chlorinated n-alkanes containing thousands of homologues and isomers which are not completely separated by standard analytical methods.

CPs are produced in Europe, North America, Australia, Brazil, South Africa and Asia. In China, where most of the world production capacity is located, 600 thousand short tons (540 thousand metric tons) tons of chlorinated paraffins were produced in 2007. Production and use volumes of CPs exceeded 1 million short tons (910 thousand metric tons) tons in 2013.

== Industrial applications ==
Production of CPs for industrial use started in the 1930s, with global production in 2000 being about 2.2 million short tons (2 million metric tons). Currently, over 200 CP formulations are in use for a wide range of industrial applications, such as flame retardants and plasticisers, as additives in metal working fluids, in sealants, paints, adhesives, textiles, leather fat and coatings.

== Safety ==
Short-chain CPs are classified as persistent and their physical properties (octanol-water partition coefficient, log K_{ow} or log P of 4.4–8, depending on the chlorination degree) imply a high potential for bioaccumulation. SCCPs are classified as toxic to aquatic organisms, and carcinogenic to rats and mice. Therefore, it was concluded that SCCPs have persistent, bioaccumulative and toxic (PBT) and very persistent, very bioaccumulative (vPvB) properties and they were added to the Candidate List of substances of very high concern for Authorisation under REACH Regulation. SCCPs (average chain length of C_{12}, chlorination degree 60 wt%) were categorised in group 2B as possibly carcinogenic to humans from the International Agency for Research on Cancer (IARC). In 2017, it was agreed to globally ban SCCPs under the Stockholm Convention on Persistent Organic Pollutants, effective December 2018.

MCCPs are also toxic to the aquatic environment and persistent; MCCPs in soil, biota, and most of the sediment cores show increasing time trends over the last years to decades; MCCP concentrations in sediment close to local sources exceed toxicity thresholds such as the predicted no-effect concentration (PNEC). In July 2021, MCCPs were added to the Candidate List of Substances of Very High Concern (SVHC) under the REACH Regulation.

Chlorinated paraffins have been detected in marine life such as cetaceans (whales) and bivalves (molluscs). Of particular concern is fetal accumulation in whales.
