= Jordahl =

Jordahl is a Norwegian family name that could refer to:

- Anders Jordahl (1878–1969), Norwegian-American developer of the first anchor channel, made of a C-shaped channel with anchors and matching T-bolts known as channel bolts
- Anneli Jordahl (born 1960), Swedish author and journalist
- Asbjørn Jordahl (1932–2025), Norwegian journalist and politician for the Labour Party
- Russell N. Jordahl, Brigadier general in the Marine Corps
- V. Trygve Jordahl, an Evangelical Lutheran Church (ELC) District President/Bishop, U.S. Army Chaplain, and Director of Service to Military Personnel (ELC)
- a female character in the Magni (character), adapted from the original Magni series about Norse mythology by Dan Jurgens
- an elementary school in Fountain, Colorado

== See also ==
- Jordahl (company)
- Jordal - city near Oslo, Norway
- Jordalsgrenda
