= Corrosion inhibitor =

Substance added to a fluid to decrease its rate of corroding a material

A corrosion inhibitor or anti-corrosive is a chemical compound added to a liquid or gas to decrease the corrosion rate of a metal that comes into contact with the fluid. The effectiveness of a corrosion inhibitor depends on fluid composition and dynamics. Corrosion inhibitors are common in industry, and also found in over-the-counter products, typically in spray form in combination with a lubricant and sometimes a penetrating oil. They may be added to water to prevent leaching of lead or copper from pipes.

A common mechanism for inhibiting corrosion involves formation of a coating, often a passivation layer, which prevents access of the corrosive substance to the metal. Permanent treatments such as chrome plating are not generally considered inhibitors, however: corrosion inhibitors are additives to the fluids that surround the metal or related object.

== Types ==
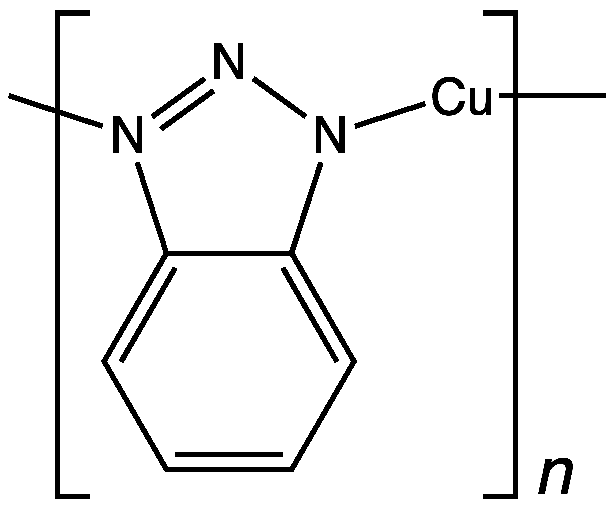
Benzotriazole inhibits corrosion of copper by forming an inert layer of this polymer on the metal's surface

The nature of the corrosive inhibitor depends on (i) the material being protected, which are most commonly metal objects, and (ii) on the corrosive agent(s) to be neutralized. The corrosive agents are generally oxygen, hydrogen sulfide, and carbon dioxide. Oxygen is generally removed by reductive inhibitors such as amines and hydrazines:

O_{2} + N_{2}H_{4} → 2 H_{2}O + N_{2}

In this example, hydrazine converts oxygen, a common corrosive agent, to water, which is generally benign. Related inhibitors of oxygen corrosion are hexamine, phenylenediamine, and dimethylethanolamine, and their derivatives. Antioxidants such as sulfite and ascorbic acid are sometimes used. Some corrosion inhibitors form a passivating coating on the surface by chemisorption. Benzotriazole is one such species used to protect copper. For lubrication, zinc dithiophosphates are common - they deposit sulfide on surfaces.

The suitability of any given chemical for a task in hand depends on many factors, including their operating temperature.

== Applications ==
Corrosion inhibitors are commonly added to:

- Coolants.
- Fuels. Some components include zinc dithiophosphates.
- Hydraulic fluids.
- Engine oil.
- Boilers. Volatile amines are added to boiler water to minimize the effects of acid. In some cases, the amines form a protective film on the steel surface and, at the same time, act as an anodic inhibitor. An inhibitor that acts both in a cathodic and anodic manner is termed a mixed inhibitor.
- Copper surfaces. Benzotriazole is used to inhibit the corrosion and staining of.
- Paint. A pigment with anticorrosive properties is zinc phosphate, which now replaces the similar red lead. Compounds derived from tannic acid or zinc salts of organonitrogens (e.g. Alcophor 827) can be used together with anticorrosive pigments. Other corrosion inhibitors are Anticor 70, Albaex, Ferrophos, and Molywhite MZAP.
- Oil field industry. Antiseptics such as benzalkonium chloride are used to counter microbial corrosion.
- Oil refineries. Corrosive hydrogen sulfide is removed using air and amines by conversion to polysulfides.

=== Tap water ===
Corrosion of tap water pipes can be influenced by a number of factors such as the pH, buffering capacity, and hardness. Methods of control include directly adjusting the pH, adding phosphates, silicates as an alternative corrosion inhibitor, or adding bicarbonates for buffer.

Orthophosphates may be added in tap water treatment systems to prevent leaching of lead and copper from water pipes and reduce the ion content in tap water to safer, legal levels. Polyphosphates can be used to control iron and manganese, which cause discoloration, but do not control lead and copper. The water industry commonly uses a blended-phosphates formulation to deal with both issues. Phosphates convert any leached ions into a layer of scale that acts to separate the metal piping from the water.

Phosphate-type inhibitors may cause eutrophication issues downstream or directly encourage algal growth in uncovered, treated water reservoirs. As a result, local water systems may elect to use alternative methods.

In areas with widespread lead and copper piping systems, corrosion control using inhibitors and monitoring techniques is central to water safety. Figures such as the chloride-to-sulfate mass ratio (CSMR) can be used to estimate the risk of corrosion at galvanic connections (i.e. desimilar pipe/solder connections, such as a lead-to-iron transition). The 2014 Flint water crisis was caused by a combination of source water change and a lack of corrosion control. The new, higher-CSMR water not only dissolved lead and iron from the pipes themselves, but also broke up previous layers of lead-containing rusty scale in pipes, allowing them to enter the water supply.

=== Fuel additives ===
- DCI-4A, widely used in commercial and military jet fuels, acts also as a lubricity additive. Can be also used for gasolines and other distillate fuels.
- DCI-6A, for motor gasoline and distillate fuels, and for U.S. military fuels (JP-4, JP-5, JP-8)
- DCI-11, for alcohols and gasolines containing oxygenates
- DCI-28, for very low-pH alcohols and gasolines containing oxygenates
- DCI-30, for gasoline and distillate fuels, excellent for pipeline transfers and storage, caustic-resistant
- DMA-4 (solution of alkylaminophosphate in kerosene), for petroleum distillates

== See also ==
- Cathodic protection
- Corrosion
- Cosmoline
- CRC Corrosion Inhibitor 5–56
- Hot-dip galvanizing
- Iron pillar of Delhi
- Marvel Mystery Oil
- Mexel
- Oil additive
- Tinning
- Truscon Laboratories
- Volatile corrosion inhibitor
- Rust converter
