= Cosmoline =

Petroleum-based corrosion inhibitor

Cosmoline is the genericized trademark for a common class of brown, wax-like petroleum-based corrosion inhibitors, typically conforming to United States Military Standard MIL-C-11796C Class 3. They are viscous when freshly applied, have a slight fluorescence, and solidify over time with exposure to air. The main ingredient in cosmoline is aliphatic petroleum solvent, which is volatile and evaporates over time.

== Description ==
Cosmoline was developed by Houghton International in the 1860s or 1870s as a pharmaceutical product. The original Cosmoline was an ointment and was used for many different cosmetic and medical purposes, including to promote hair growth. It was kept in homes to disinfect wounds and was used by veterinarians to treat cuts, abrasions, bruises and sprains. Cosmoline could be found on farms, where it was used to relieve swelling in cow's udders.

Cosmoline became widely known when it received a government specification as a rust preventive and began its use by the military to protect various equipment from rust and corrosion. Cosmoline could be found on military equipment in the Spanish–American War, World War I, World War II, and the Korean and Vietnam Wars. Cosmoline conforms to MIL-SPEC (MIL-C-11796C, Class 3) for Preservative and Sealing Compounds.

Chemically, cosmoline is a homogeneous mixture of oily and waxy long-chain, non-polar hydrocarbons. It is always brown in color, but can differ in viscosity and shear strength. Cosmoline melts at 45–52 °C (113–126 °F) and has a flash point of 185 °C (365 °F).

== Use ==
The most common use of cosmoline is in the storage and preservation of some firearms, hand tools, machine tools and their tooling, and marine equipment. Entire vehicles can be preserved with cosmoline, as was attempted with Miss Belvedere.

Cosmoline is also frequently applied to automotive disc brake rotors at the factory, to prevent corrosion inside the box before the rotor is placed into service on a vehicle. It is easily removed by spraying brake cleaner on the braking surfaces of the rotor although brake pad manufacturers do not recommend this technique. These manufacturers recommend that rotors be washed with dish soap and water to remove cosmoline, as well as after machining brake drums and rotors.

During World War II cosmoline was used to coat weapons, including entire tanks, for long sea voyages, to prevent corrosion in salty maritime conditions. U.S. Coast Artillerymen serving the huge coastal artillery batteries were known as "Cosmoliners" as they were regularly assigned the task of "greasing down" their big guns.

Cosmoline was also used during the Pacific island campaigns in World War II by the United States Marines, who sang a song about it to the tune of the popular big-band hit Tangerine: "Cosmoline ... keeps my rifle clean". Many felt that it had been invented not merely to prevent rust on their weapons but for making soldiers' lives miserable. Historical fiction author W. E. B. Griffin, in his 1986 novel Semper Fi, describes in great detail the difficulties that cosmoline removal presented to a typical group of U.S. Marine Corps officer candidates in the months leading up to U.S. involvement in World War II.

== Aging and removal ==
Freshly applied cosmoline, or that which is hermetically sealed in a plastic bag or shrink wrap, retains its grease-like viscosity and wipes near clean with a rag, leaving only a thin film behind. Older cosmoline which has had air exposure usually solidifies after a few years, once its volatile hydrocarbon fraction evaporates and leaves behind only the waxy remainder. This solid wax does not readily wipe off. It can be removed with laborious scraping but leaves crumbs to be swept or vacuumed away.

An effective and non-abrasive method to remove cosmoline safely is accomplished using a dry ice blaster. High pressure compressed air with solid CO_{2} particles is directed to any area to be cleaned until removed. An experienced operator is required in order to protect the underlying substrate. Once removed, the cosmoline is blown away from the subject with gravity bringing it to the floor or surrounding horizontal surface. If properly performed, the results do not harm or change the finish of the protected surface. Application of gentle heat sufficient to melt the waxy hydrocarbons allows cosmoline to drip off. Penetrating oil (such as WD-40 or CRC 5-56 CLP) sprayed and allowed to soak in until cosmoline is restored to a viscous-fluid state allows it to be wiped off. A closed-cabinet parts washer may be used to power wash smaller items. An aqueous rather than petrochemical-based wash requires high heat, the proper aqueous detergent, and the correct hydraulic impact pressure.

Soldiers in field conditions have often used gasoline or another handy petroleum-based solvent (such as kerosene) to clean cosmoline off stored weapons, which is also very effective; after the gasoline has time to soak in, the cosmoline returns to its viscous, oily state and can be easily wiped off.

It is not recommended to use harsh chemical solvents that could strip paint, finishes, or other aesthetic/functional coatings from the gun's surface. A better solvent is Stoddard Solvent, or mineral spirits, Coleman fuel, or its camp fuel equivalent

All cosmoline cleaning methods create hazardous waste that must be disposed of properly. Aqueous or solvent cleaning both have accepted methods to dispose of the "sludge" created. It has been reported that talcum powder can be used as an absorbent of cosmoline by packing the powder around the item to be cleaned and applying sufficient heat to melt the solid film, allowing the compound to be wicked from the coated surface into the talcum, which can be scraped off more easily.

Cosmoline has been effectively cleaned from rifles using ultrasonic cleaning systems. Boiling parts in water is also an effective way to remove cosmoline without damage.

== See also ==
- Cathodic protection for vehicles
- Hot-dip galvanizing
- Iron pillar of Delhi
- Marvel Mystery Oil
- Oil additive
- Tinning
- Truscon Laboratories
- Volatile corrosion inhibitor
