= Julius Kahn =

Julius Kahn may refer to:

- Julius Kahn (inventor) (1874–1942), engineer of reinforced concrete
- Julius Kahn (congressman) (1861–1924), United States congressman
