= Jordahl (company) =

Former American-German fastener manufacturer

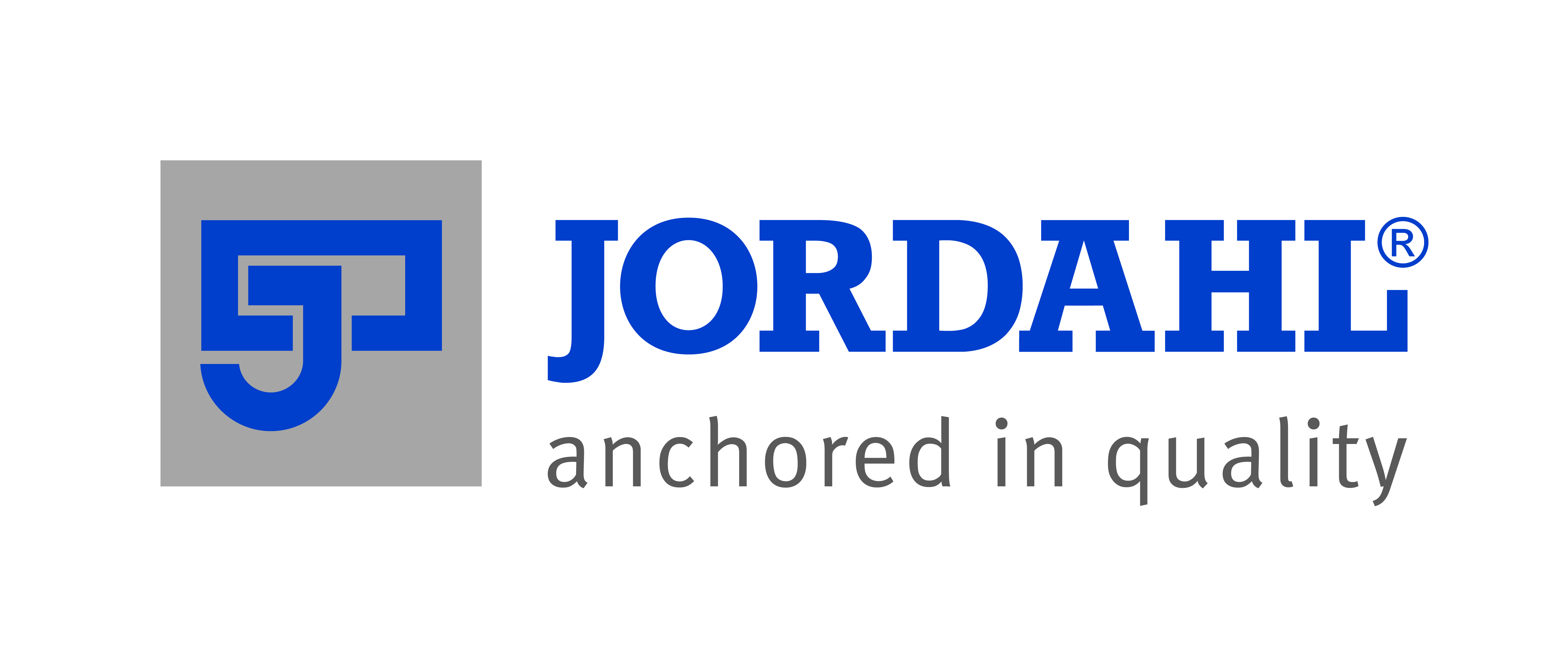
- Type: Private
- Industry: Fastener
- Founded: 1907
- Defunct: 2022
- Fate: Merger
- Headquarters: Berlin, Germany

Jordahl GmbH was a company founded in Berlin in 1907 as "Deutsche Kahneisen Gesellschaft Jordahl & Co." that specialized in the manufacture and distribution of fastening, reinforcement, connection, and mounting technology products. In 2022, it was absorbed into PohlCon GmbH.

== History ==
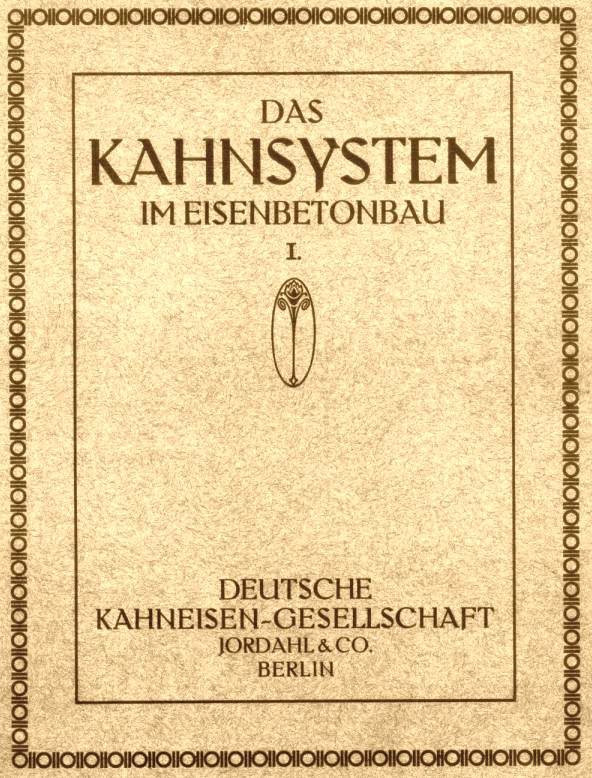
Binder for company documents from the 1910s.

At the beginning of the 20th century, civil engineer Julius Kahn developed the Kahn system in America with the proprietary "Kahn bar" reinforcement for reinforced concrete. The Kahn system was used, among other things, to construct buildings designed by his brother, architect Albert Kahn, which belonged to the most spectacular structures of their time. This can be seen, for example, in the Packard Automotive Plant, the New Center Building (nowadays the Albert Kahn Building) and the Fisher Building in Detroit. In 1907, Swedish civil engineer Ivar Kreuger secured the European marketing rights for the Kahn system. In the same year, he and his friend, civil engineer Anders Jordahl, founded the Deutsche Kahneisen Gesellschaft Jordahl & Co. in Berlin.

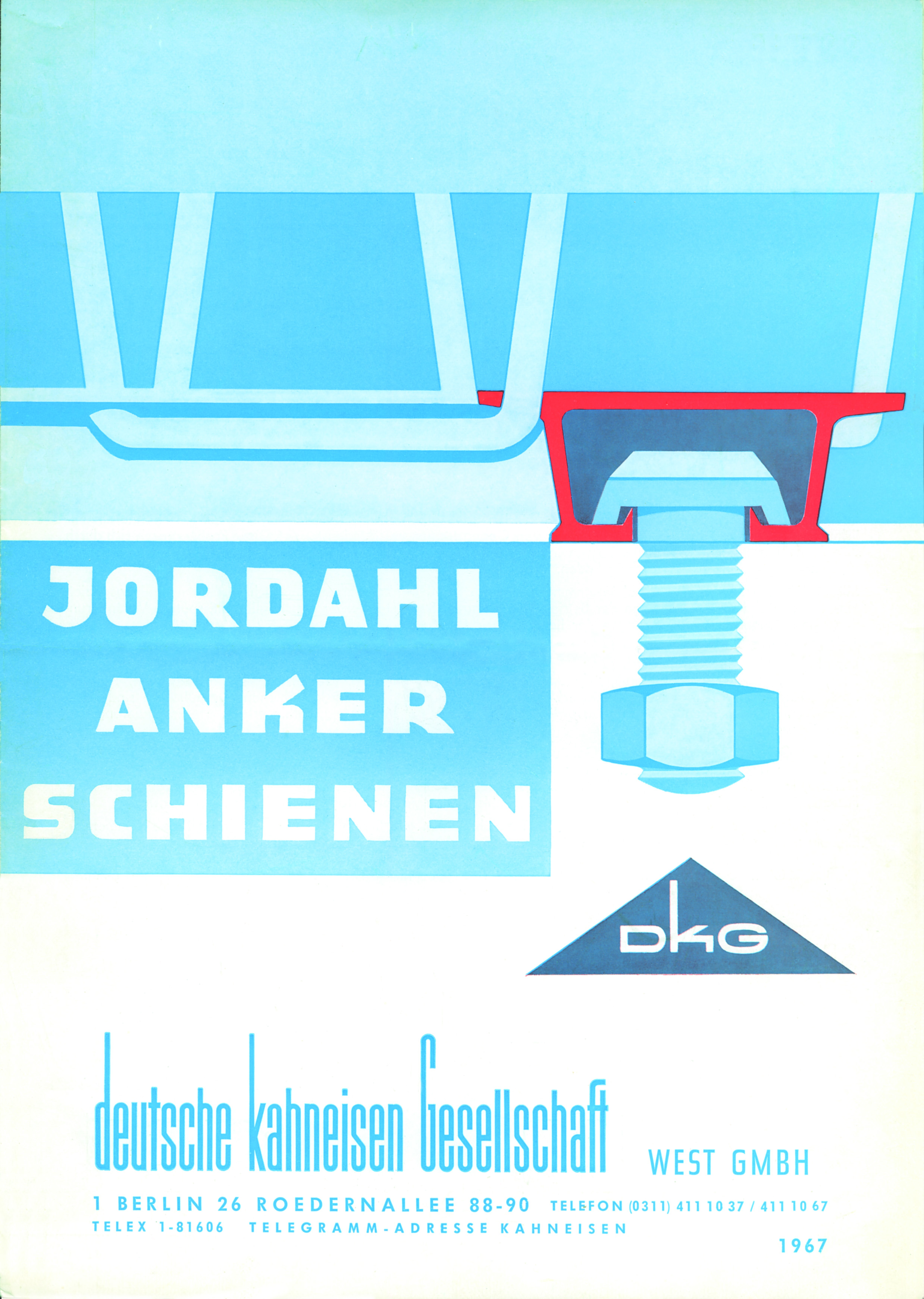
Binder for company documents from the 1960s.

In 1913, Anders Jordahl invented the anchor channel. While the Kahneisen quickly lost importance due to the standardization of reinforced concrete construction and the use of standardized reinforcing bars, the anchor channel became the most important product of the company, which was converted into Deutsche Kahneisen GmbH after World War I. The administration had its offices in the center of Berlin at the intersection of Friedrichstraße and Unter den Linden, while production was set up in Lichtenberg. After World War II, the administration and production were located in communist East Berlin in divided Germany. Due to the threat of expropriation, the company was relocated to Reinickendorf, which is located in West Berlin.

In 1977, Deutsche Kahneisen GmbH was taken over by the Pohl family and later relocated within West Berlin to Neukölln. In the following years, the product portfolio was expanded. In 2012, the company was renamed Jordahl GmbH. In the same year, the American companies Continental in Canada and Decon in the USA, which manufacture punching shear reinforcement, were acquired. In 2022, Jordahl GmbH merged with other companies owned by the Pohl family to form PohlCon GmbH. The subsidiaries, which meanwhile had been renamed Jordahl Canada Inc. and Jordahl USA Inc., were renamed PohlCon Canada Inc. and PohlCon USA Inc. in 2026. The "Jordahl" brand continues to exist.
