= Marvel Mystery Oil =

American automotive oil additive

Marvel Mystery Oil logo

Marvel Mystery Oil is an automotive product of the American Marvel Oil Company, founded by Burt Pierce in 1923. It is used as a fuel additive and oil additive, purportedly to function as a corrosion inhibitor, penetrating oil, transmission leak stopper and seal relubricator, despite a lack of scientific evidence supporting such claims.

It is composed primarily of petroleum distillates, including mineral oil (60–100%), mineral spirits (10–30%), tricresyl phosphate (an antiwear and extreme pressure additive in lubricants, 0.1–1.0%), ortho-dichlorobenzene (a softening and removing agent for carbon-based contamination on metal surfaces, 0.1–1.0%), and para-dichlorobenzene (a precursor used in the production of chemically and thermally resistant polymers, <0.1%).

== Origin ==
The Marvel Oil Company (also known as Marvel Carburetor Company; Marvel-Schebler Carburetors since 1928) was founded by Burt Pierce in 1923. Before World War I, the company produced carburetors for automobiles and aircraft. Some of these encountered problems with clogged jets, prompting Pierce to formulate a blend of chemicals and petroleum to clean and maintain them. Marvel claims the oil creates a top ring seal producing higher compression, preventing blow-by on power strokes, resulting in more power. Supporting evidence is not provided.

The Marvel Oil Company, initially based in Chicago, moved to New York in 1941; it was purchased by Turtle Wax Inc. in 1999, returning to Chicago.

According to the company, the name Mystery Oil comes from Pierce's answer to the question, "What kind of oil is this?" to which Pierce would respond, "It's a mystery!"

== Composition ==
According to the company's 2015 safety data sheet, Marvel Mystery Oil is composed of:

- Petroleum distillates (hydrotreated heavy naphthenic), also known as mineral oil, 60–100%
- Petroleum distillates (Stoddard solvent), also known as white spirit, 10–30%
- Tricresyl phosphate, an antiwear and extreme pressure additive in lubricants 0.1–1.0%
- Ortho-dichlorobenzene, a softening and removing agent for carbon-based contamination on metal surfaces, 0.1–1.0%
- Para-dichlorobenzene, a precursor used in the production of chemically and thermally resistant polymers, <0.1%

In an NTSB post aircraft accident investigation published in 2003, it was reported that Marvel Mystery Oil was composed of 74 percent mineral oil, 25 percent stoddard solvent, and 1 percent lard.

== Claims ==
Marvel Mystery Oil marketing literature claims benefits which include improved lubricating qualities, primarily cleaning and friction reduction capabilities. The product has previously been marketed as a fuel additive in all kinds of engines, including aircraft (although the company no longer markets it for the latter application on their website). It has also been used as an oil additive, corrosion inhibitor, penetrating oil, and in automatic transmissions as a leak stopper and seal relubricator. Supporting evidence for claimed benefits is not provided by the manufacturer.

The lubricant was used as a fuel additive in a Lycoming aircraft engine that suffered catastrophic damage during take-off. The engine manufacturer specifically cautioned against oil additives in Service Instruction No. 1014M, which also stated their use would void the warranty. The NTSB listed the probable cause of the accident as "The improper use of [a] fuel additive which resulted in a power loss."

Auto manufacturers Ford and GM recommend against using engine oil additives, stating they are unnecessary in their contemporary engine designs and may void their warranties.
