= Miss Belvedere =

Time capsule car

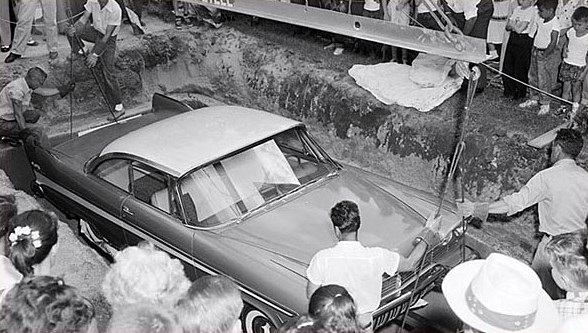
- Miss Belvedere being lowered into the vault
- Date: June 15, 1957 – June 14, 2007
- Duration: 50 years
- Location: City Courthouse, Tulsa, Oklahoma; 36.1492°N 95.9953°W
- Motive: Time capsule
- Organized by: Golden Jubilee Committee

Miss Belvedere is a 1957 Plymouth Belvedere that was sealed in an underground vault on the grounds of the Tulsa city courthouse on June 15, 1957, as a 50-year time capsule: a "product of American industrial ingenuity with the kind of lasting appeal that will still be in style 50 years [later]."

The car, a gold and white sport coupe with four miles on its odometer, was buried as part of Tulsa's "Tulsarama" Golden Jubilee Week festivities celebrating Oklahoma's 50th year of statehood. As a time capsule, it was intended to be unearthed and presented to the person or their descendent who came nearest to guessing Tulsa's population fifty years later, in 2007. The poured in place concrete enclosure had been sprayed with pneumatically applied gunite and advertised as capable of withstanding nuclear attack.

Nicknamed Miss Belvedere by a member of the 2007 organizing committee, the car was unearthed for the state's centennial celebration and publicly presented the following day only to discover the vault had been long breached by water and the car itself had suffered significant cosmetic and structural damage.

After stabilization and ten years in storage, the Plymouth was accepted by the Historic Auto Attractions Museum in Roscoe, Illinois where it remains on display as of 2025, largely unrestored.

== History ==
=== Burial (1957) ===
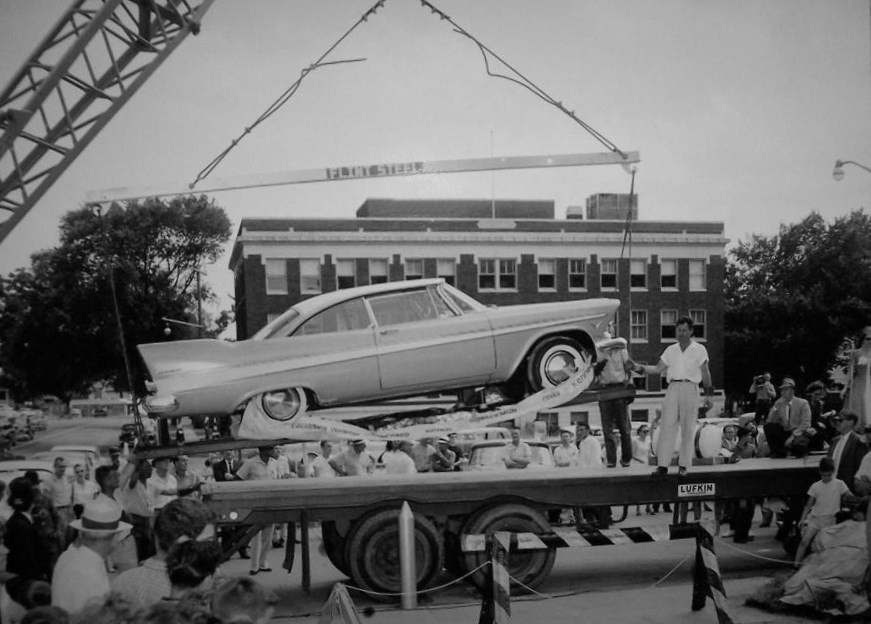

As part of the city of Tulsa's "Tulsarama" Golden Jubilee Week festivities celebrating Oklahoma's 50th year of statehood, it was decided to bury, in an underground vault, a new desert gold and sand dune white two-tone 1957 Plymouth Belvedere sport coupe. Also, along with the unnamed vehicle, other contemporary items were placed inside the vault as a time capsule for the people of the year 2007. It was felt that these items, when the vault was opened in 2007, would help acquaint future generations with life in 1957. When asked why the 1957 Plymouth Belvedere was chosen, event chairman Lewis Roberts Sr. was quoted that the car represented "an advanced product of American industrial ingenuity with the kind of lasting appeal that will still be in style 50 years from now." The car was donated by Plymouth Motors and a group of Plymouth car dealers from the Tulsa area. Ultimately, the car was intended to be a prize awarded upon the vehicle's unearthing for the individual, or their descendant, who came nearest to guessing Tulsa's population in 2007. An additional prize of the value of a savings account, started with a $100.00 deposit in 1957, would also be awarded to the winner of the car. The contest was advertised with the slogan "Suddenly It's 2007” which was a variation of the 1957 Plymouth advertising campaign "Suddenly, it's 1960 ...". A matching automobile had been awarded in a separate contest a few days prior.

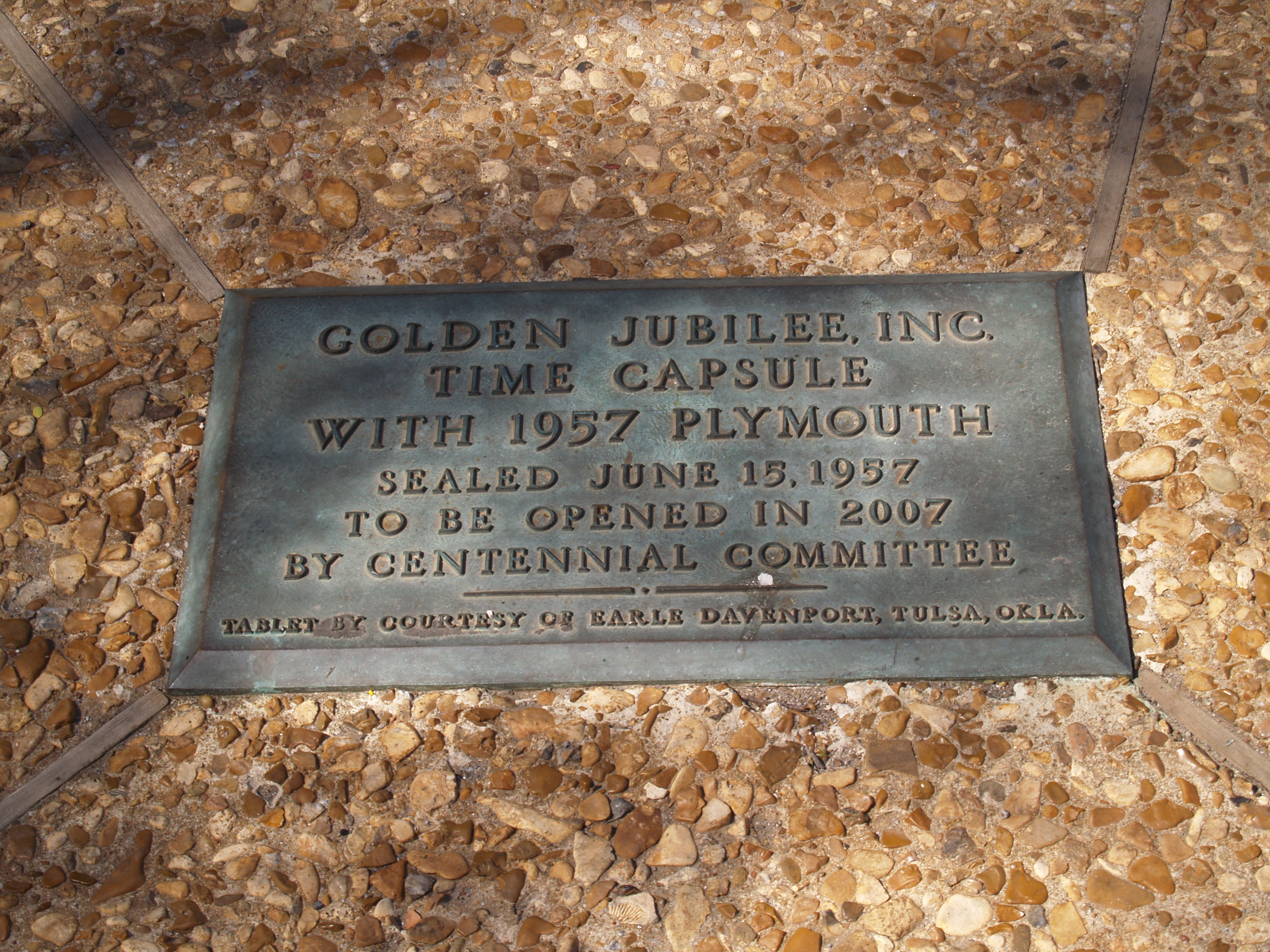
Plaque over the time capsule containing "Miss Belvedere". Photo taken in Tulsa, OK on March 16, 2006. The vault was opened the following year in celebration of Oklahoma's statehood centennial celebration.

A large number of items were placed inside the trunk and glove box of Miss Belvedere. A partial list of items included a five-gallon container of gasoline, a case of motor oil, a case of Schlitz beer and items that were considered typical contents of a woman's purse, which included a bottle of tranquilizers, an unpaid parking ticket, 14 bobby pins, a compact, cigarettes and matches, two combs, a tube of lipstick, a package of gum, a plastic rain hat, pocket facial tissues, and $2.73 in bills and coins. Some of the items placed in the sealed steel capsule, welded shut and painted white, behind the car included a 48-star American flag, letters from various state and city officials and documentation for a savings account valued at $100 in 1957 along with entry postcards for the contest regarding the city's population in 2007.

A 12 feet (3.7 m) by 20 feet (6.1 m) underground poured in place concrete vault, with pneumatically applied gunite on its interior walls, had been prepared in the courthouse lawn with the top of the vault being three feet below the surface. Miss Belvedere was placed on a steel skid with her tires off the ground and the vehicle was lowered into the vault a number of times for publicity photos to be taken. After being lowered for the final time, the car was coated in a cosmoline like substance and was then wrapped in layers of sealed plastic. It was hoped that these actions would protect the car from moisture that might seep in. Concrete beams were set on top of the vault as a lid and then the beams were sprayed with gunite to seal the vault. Following the replacement of dirt and sod, a bronze marker, donated by a local cemetery, was placed to mark the spot. In 1997 there were some people expecting that the car would be unearthed due to the inscription on the marker which read "Golden Jubilee, Inc. Time Capsule with 1957 Plymouth To Be Opened in 2007 by Centennial Committee." It was mistakenly thought that the "Centennial Committee" referred to the group that was organizing the centennial celebration for the City of Tulsa in 1997.

=== Unearthing (2007) ===
In the years leading up to the anticipated opening of the vault, some speculating the car would be found in near pristine condition, and others concerned moisture may have entered the vault causing damage. It was unknown if a nearby 1973 construction accident involving damage to a water main that flooded the area, had affected the vault. After eighteen months of preparation by volunteers, the vault was opened on June 14, 2007, during the state's centennial celebration. In press interviews, the 2007 organizing committee co-chairman Sharon King Davis acknowledged that she had named the vehicle Miss Belvedere, though the official website used leading up to the event did not use the nickname. Interest in the event went viral, with news organizations and interested people from abroad attending the event. Organizers had made arrangements with vehicle customizer Boyd Coddington, under a sponsorship arrangement, to use the sponsor's products in starting the car once removed from the vault. A local crane service volunteered to lift the car from the vault, and customized lifting equipment was fabricated. An identical model Plymouth Belvedere was found and test lifts were made with the vehicle to verify the center of gravity for the lift.

Those working on the project were dismayed to find the car in nearly 2,000 US gallons (7,600 L; 1,700 imp gal) of standing water that was 4 feet (1.2 m) high, with evidence suggesting the water had risen at one time to just below the lid, covering the entire vehicle. In line with the Cold War realities of late 1950s America, the concrete enclosure was advertised as having been built to withstand nuclear attack, but was not airtight, which allowed water infiltration. At its removal, the Plymouth remained wrapped in ripped plastic covering, making it impossible to see its actual condition, though inundation of the vehicle was already indisputable. A hazmat team assessed the vehicle for potential danger to the public, discovering hydrocarbons from oil and gas that had been buried with the vehicle.

The standing water was pumped out of the vault, the car was prepared for lifting, then removed and transported to the Tulsa Convention Center before being presented on June 15, 2007. Boyd Coddington and his team were on hand to evaluate and start the car, impossible due to the car's condition. Though its corroded keys were found in the ignition and its tires were uninflatable, the signatures of those on hand at its burial were legible. Items buried with the vehicle in a sealed steel container emerged unscathed, but anything buried unprotected in the vehicle was heavily damaged or had deteriorated completely from water intrusion. Among the items recovered from the trunk were rusty cans from a case of Schlitz beer and the 5-US-gallon (19 L; 4.2 imp gal) containers of gasoline and oil that was intended to be used for starting the car in 2007 if gasoline was no longer the fuel of choice for motor vehicles. The glass containers of gasoline and motor oil that were buried with the car were taken to the University of Oklahoma for testing and research. Following the unveiling ceremony, Miss Belvedere was temporarily placed on display at a local car dealership.

The car was intended to be a prize awarded to the individual, or his or her descendant, who came nearest to guessing Tulsa's population in 2007. Out of 812 entries, the winning entrant was Raymond Humbertson, whose guess of 384,743 was closest to the actual figure of 382,457. It was learned that Humbertson had died in 1979, his wife in 1988, and the couple did not have children. The car and the savings account, which had grown to $666.85 from its original 1957 value of $100—were awarded to Humbertson's surviving sisters and nephew. Humbertson's relatives noted he had never lived in the Tulsa area and were unsure why he'd entered the 1957 contest.

=== Stabilization ===
In November 2007, Humbertson's relatives shipped the car to the New Jersey facilities of Ultra One, a restoration firm whose specialty product is a de-rusting solution which is designed to remove only rust while leaving the underlying metal, paint and decals intact. It was estimated that the stabilization project would take roughly six months or perhaps longer, given the difficulty of removing the mix of cosmoline and mud that were caked on the car. While there were no plans to disassemble or restore the vehicle, there were discussions regarding the return of the drivetrain and electrical system to operating condition.

In May 2009, when Dwight Foster of Ultra One participated in a podcast and provided details and new pictures, it was shown that Miss Belvedere's restoration was still underway, with the car's exterior having been virtually freed of its rust and mud concretions. Foster noted that he had purchased a 1957 Plymouth Savoy as a donor car to replace needed parts to keep Miss Belvedere from further deterioration, and the initial offer was a promotional stunt for his business. It was hoped that the frame and trunk under body would be used from the Savoy to replace the weakened original parts. However, after investing more than $15,000, and after evaluating the condition of the frame and body, Foster halted further restoration efforts. The car stayed in Ultra One's warehouse for ten years, while a permanent display location was sought.

=== Exhibition ===
After stabilization was completed, the city of Tulsa declined the car for permanent display, as did the Smithsonian.

In 2015, Foster announced the car had been accepted by the Historic Auto Attractions Museum in Roscoe, Illinois. After Wayne Lensing, owner of the museum, initially projected the exhibition could open by 2016, the car was shipped to the museum in 2017 and prepared for exhibition before opening on June 9, 2020 — where it remains as of 2025.
