= Turtle Wax =

American automotive products company

Turtle Wax, Inc.
- Type: Privately Held
- Founded: 1941; 85 years ago (as Plastone)
- Founder: Benjamin Hirsch
- Headquarters: Lombard, Illinois, United States
- Key people: Denis John Healy (Executive Chairman)
- Number of employees: 51-200
- Website: www.turtlewax.com

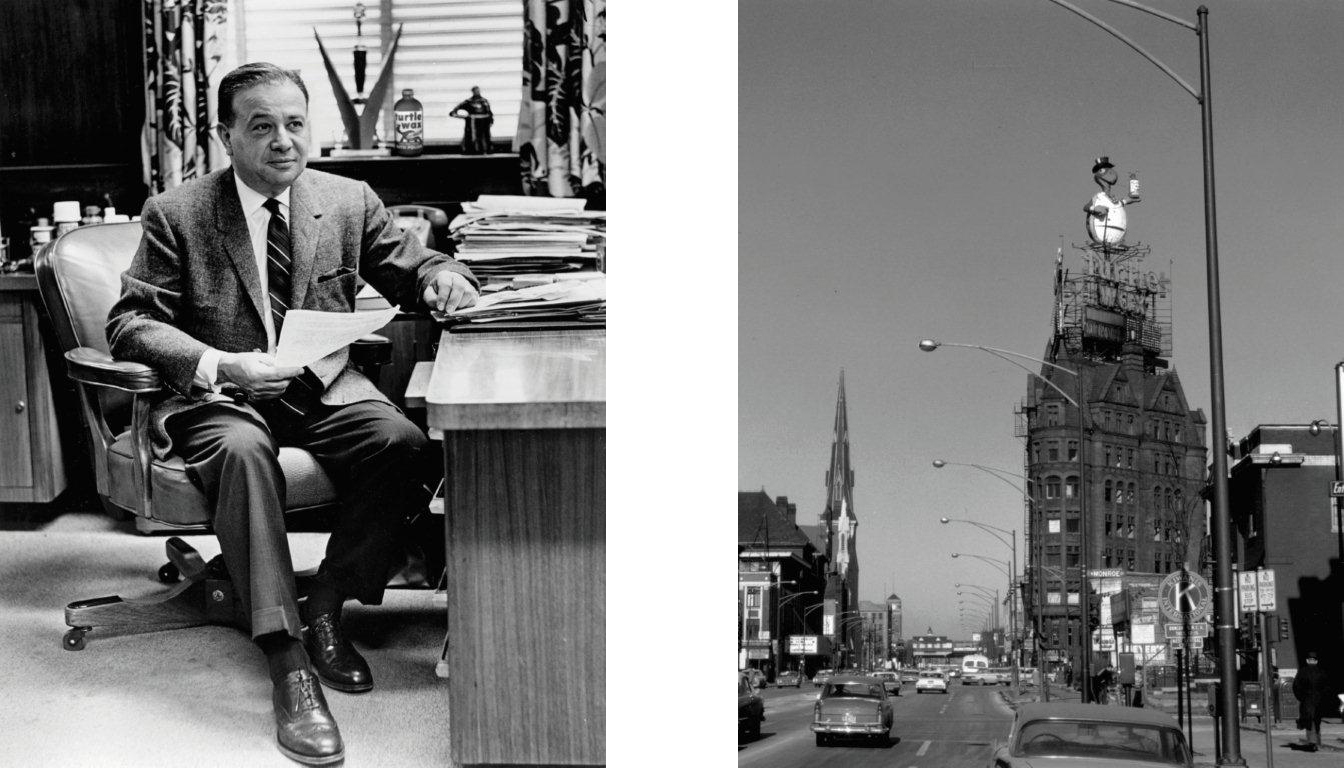
Benjamin Hirsch

Turtle Wax, Inc. (known simply as Turtle Wax) is an American manufacturer of automotive appearance products. The company was founded by Benjamin Hirsch in Chicago in 1941. It is currently headquartered in Lombard, Illinois, having relocated from Addison, Illinois in 2024.

== Products ==
As of 2017, Turtle Wax primarily serves the retail consumer market; the company's primary product lines include cleaning and polishing products for cars including glass, painted surfaces, uncoated metals, leather, wheels, tires, and more.

In 2019, the brand introduced its upmarket "Hybrid Solutions" product range. The line reflects the brand's more technology-forward, premium offerings, with ingredients such as ceramic and graphene additives.

In 2023, Turtle Wax partnered with tattoo and street artist Mister Cartoon to create a new line of products, The Art of Car Care. The line features original hand-drawn labels from Cartoon and unique packaging, as well as products aimed at lowrider owners.

The company sold its Professional Products arm, focused on professional detailer and commercial car wash customers, to Cambridge, Ontario based Transchem Inc. in 2013. Transchem was in turn acquired by Dover Corporation subsidiary OPW in 2024. Turtle Wax has marketed its cleaning products for non-automotive applications, as well.

Turtle Wax also offers automotive performance chemicals such as engine treatment products and formula oils under the Marvel Mystery Oil and CD-2 brands. Additionally, the company operates full-service car wash facilities in the Chicago Metropolitan area.
