= V. Trygve Jordahl =

American official of the Lutheran Church (1898–1984)

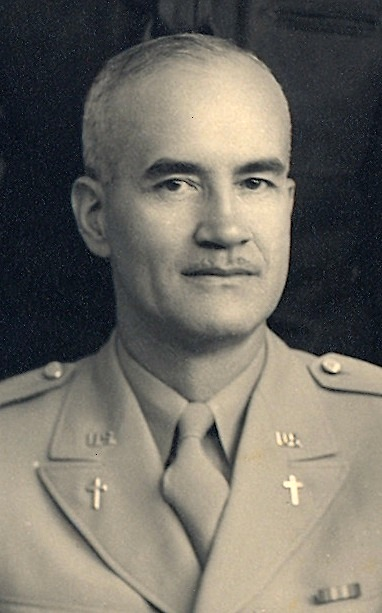
- Family photo of V.T. from 1943
- Born: October 26, 1898; Norway Lake Township, Minnesota
- Died: September 27, 1984 (aged 85); Decorah, Iowa
- Military career
- Allegiance: United States of America
- Branch: United States Army
- Service years: 1943–1946
- Rank: Chaplain Captain
- Conflicts: World War II
- Awards: 2 Letters of Commendation, U.S. Army, 1945
- Other work: Director of Service to Military Personnel, Evangelical Lutheran Church, 1959

Verner Trygve "V.T." Jordahl (Norwegian: [ˈvæ̂ːɳə ˈʈrʏ̂ɡvə ˈvîːtiː ˈjûːrɑːɫ]; October 26, 1898 – September 27, 1984) was an Evangelical Lutheran Church (ELC) District President; he served as a U.S. Army Chaplain, on the Luther College Board of Regents, and was the ELC Director of Service to Military Personnel.

Jordahl was born October 26, 1898, in Norway Lake, Minnesota, as a second generation immigrant from Norway. He retired in Sun City, Arizona. He died on September 27, 1984, at his summer home in Decorah, Iowa. He received his Bachelor of Arts (B.A.) degree from Luther College in 1922, where he had also attended preparatory school. He then attended Luther Seminary in Saint Paul, Minnesota, and received his Bachelor of Theology in 1925.

== Pastoral career ==
In 1925, Jordahl accepted a call to be pastor of Central Lutheran Church in Dallas, Texas. He was at Central Lutheran for eight years. After turning down five calls over many years from other churches to be their pastor, he finally accepted a call in May 1933 to Our Savior's Lutheran Church in Cleveland, Ohio.

== Military service ==
On September 25, 1943, V.T. enlisted as a U.S. Army Chaplain. He attended Chaplain's school at Harvard University. His first assignment was as a chaplain on transport ships, which would bring troops to and from battle. His next chaplain assignment was to a Prisoner of War (POW) camp in Alva, Oklahoma, where there were about 4,800 POW's, predominantly German Nazi’s. He received commendations for his work here to establish contact between POW's and their relatives in the U.S. He also worked to identify Lutheran clergymen (conscripted into the Wehrmacht) among the POW's in order to establish congregations. His discharge from the U.S. Army was April 28, 1946.

In July 1946 V.T. accepted a call as pastor of St. Olaf's Lutheran Church in Bode, Iowa.

== Bishop and Service to Military Personnel ==
In October 1948, he was elected bishop (also called district president) of the South Central District of the Evangelical Lutheran Church (ELC). This district was, at the time, the largest district in the ELC, stretching from Iowa down through Texas. He served in this position for 11 years and during this time he received an honorary Doctorate from Luther College.

In 1959, V.T. was appointed by the president of the ELC, Fredrik A. Schiotz, to serve as the director of the newly formed agency, Service to Military Personnel. (In 1960, the ELC joined with other Lutheran churches to form the American Lutheran Church.) The position was the bishop to all Lutheran chaplains in the U.S. military and entailed coordinating all U.S. Lutheran chaplaincy operations around the world. This office was based in Minneapolis and the family lived in Golden Valley, MN.

== Career Timeline ==
- 1925 – Senior Pastor, Central Lutheran Church; Dallas, Texas
- 1933 – Senior Pastor, Our Saviour's Lutheran Church; Cleveland, Ohio
- 1943 – U.S. Army Chaplain
- 1946 – Pastor, St. Olaf's Lutheran Church; Bode, Iowa
- 1948 – District President/Bishop, South Central District, Evangelical Lutheran Church
- 1959 – Director, Service to Military Personnel, Evangelical Lutheran Church; Minneapolis, Minnesota

== Family ==
V.T. was the middle of seven children: Dagmar, Esther, Harold, V.T., Scriver, Nils, and Solveig. V.T. and his siblings were the first generation of their Jordahl ancestors born in the United States, as father Daniel Christopherson (known as D.C.) was born in Jordalsgrenda, Norway and his mother, Johanna, was born in Red Wing, Minnesota. She died when V.T. was only six years old. This made V.T. a second generation immigrant. On September 25, 1925, V.T. was married to Norma Resida Johnson at Madison Lutheran Church in Ridgeway, Iowa. V.T. and Norma knew each other growing up since they both attended and were confirmed at Madison Lutheran. The first three Jordahl children (Rodger, Daniel, and Norma) were born in Dallas between 1926 and 1929. The last Jordahl child, Vern Truman was born in Cleveland in the mid-1930s.

== See also ==
- Evangelical Lutheran Church
- Luther College (Iowa)
- Jordalsgrenda, Norway
