= Volatile corrosion inhibitor =

Material that protects metals from corrosion

A volatile corrosion inhibitor (VCI) is a material that protects metal from corrosion through the release of vapors (volatilization). General corrosion inhibitors are chemical compounds that can decrease the corrosion rate of a material, typically a metal or an alloy. According to NACE International Standard TM0208, VCIs operate through a process of volatilization, vapor transport within an enclosed atmosphere, and subsequent condensation onto a metal surface to form a molecular layer that protects the surface by absorption, dissolution, or hydrophobic effects, thereby inhibiting the rate of corrosion. They are also called vapor-phase inhibitors, vapor-phase corrosion inhibitors, and vapor-transported corrosion inhibitors.

VCIs come in various formulations that depend on the application (such as films, oils, coatings, or cleaners) or metal type (ferrous, nonferrous, or multi-metal). Other variables include the amount of vapor phase compared to the contact phase inhibitors. Because they are volatile at ambient temperature, VCI compounds can reach inaccessible crevices in metallic structures.

Vacuum VCI (V.VCI) have special properties of performance in vacuum as well as corrosion protection properties.

== History ==
The first wide-scale use of VCIs can be traced to Shell's patent for dicyclohexylammonium nitrite (DICHAN), which was eventually commercialized as VPI 260. DICHAN was used extensively by the US military to protect a wide variety of metallic components from corrosion via various delivery systems (e.g. VCI powder, VCI paper, VCI solution, VCI slushing compound).

Concerns regarding health, safety, and performance limitations have led to the decline of DICHAN in favor of modern VCI compounds, which are typically salts of moderately strong bases and weak volatile acids. The typical bases are amines, and the acids are carbonic, nitrous, and carboxylic.

== VCI corrosion protection mechanism ==
For steel, the first step in the VCI application process is the volatilization of the inhibitor into the airspace. This may entail simple evolution of the molecule or the chemical may dissociate first and then volatilize. The molecules will then diffuse through the enclosed airspace until some of the molecules reach the metallic surface to be protected.

Once the molecules reach the metallic surface, two interactions may occur. In the first interaction, the molecule may adsorb onto the metal surface, thereby forming a barrier against corrosive ions and displacing any condensed water. The second interaction involves the condensed water layer that has been shown to exist on the metallic surface. The VCI molecules will dissolve into the condensed water layer, raising the pH. An alkaline pH has been shown to have a beneficial effect on the corrosion resistance for steel.

The process for copper begins the same as for steel, with the evolution of the inhibitor. Once at the copper surface, however, the inhibitor will form a copper benzotriazole complex, which is protective.

Vapor pressure is a critical parameter in VCI effectiveness. The most favorable range of pressure is 10^{−3} to 10^{−2} Pa at room temperature. Insufficient pressure leads to the slow establishment of the protective layer; if the pressure is too high, VCI effectiveness is limited to a short time.

== Product uses ==
VCIs have been applied across a wide variety of application areas:

Packaging – One of the first widespread uses of VCIs was VCI paper, which was used to wrap parts for transportation and storage. The technology later evolved with the development of VCI film, in which the inhibitor was incorporated into polyethylene film. VCI technology subsequently evolved to include the impregnation of inhibitors, such as sodium nitrite, directly into polyethylene film. This allows metallic components to be stored without the need for rust-preventative (RP) oils, which typically require removal before the parts are put into service. In areas where the VCI film is in direct contact with the metal, VCI molecules adsorb onto the metal surfaces, creating an invisible molecular barrier against corrosive elements such as oxygen, moisture, and chlorides. As VCI molecules vaporize from the film and diffuse throughout the package, they also form a protective molecular layer on metal surfaces that are not in direct contact with the film. When the packaging is removed, the VCI molecules vaporize and disperse.

VCI films protect metals through both direct contact and vapor action. Large equipment and other assets can be wrapped in VCI heat-shrinkable film for long-term outdoor storage. Polymer films used to protect electronic equipment during shipment or storage should take into account the prevention of electrostatic discharge and corrosion, as well as the disposal of the film after use. One property that makes polymer film a suitable packaging material for electronic equipment is its ability to prevent electrostatic discharge. More recently, biodegradability has also been incorporated as a property of some VCI films.

Coatings – The use of VCIs as alternative corrosion inhibitor technologies in coating is not a new concept. However, with recent growing environmental pressure to reduce the use of traditional inhibitors containing heavy metals, they have gained in popularity. Because VCI particles possess a polar attraction to metal substrates, they can be integrated into coatings without disrupting the performance of other additives, such as defoamers or wetting and leveling agents. VCIs are typically added to the formulation in very small amounts by weight of the overall formula. The particle size of the VCIs is very small in comparison to traditionally used inhibitors. This allows the VCIs to more effectively migrate into smaller voids. Once adsorbed on the metal surface, the VCIs provide a hydrophobic moisture barrier, which prevents the formation of corrosion cells and renders moisture ineffective.

Emitter – VCI (in the form of a capsule, foam, cup) is placed within a container (such as an electrical cabinet or junction box) to provide corrosion protection to its various interior components. VCI emitters provide best protection against hydrogen sulfide (H_{2}S), sulfur dioxide (SO_{2}), ammonia, and humidity. VCI emitters are primarily used for electrical components, as they do not alter electrical, surface, or optical properties.

Pipe casings – A mixture of VCI and a hydrogel is injected into the annular space between the pipe casing (the outer pipe) and the carrier pipe (the inner pipe) to provide corrosion protection to the carrier pipe. This application has recently been of wider interest as it has been approved by PHMSA as a means to address a shorted casing in a CP-protected pipeline. (PHMSA rules dictate that a shorted casing on a PHMSA regulated pipeline be repaired or treated.) Details can also be found in NACE SP-200.

Pipeline preservation (internal) – VCIs are seeing widespread application for the mitigation of corrosion of the internal surfaces of new or out-of-service pipelines. Top-of-the-line (TOL) corrosion typically occurs in wet gas pipelines that have a stratified flow regime and poor thermal insulation. TOL corrosion is predominantly a problem of protection in the gas phase. Tests showed that the best potential for providing corrosion protection for TOL came from azoles, certain acetylene alcohols, and a "green" volatile aldehyde.

For new pipelines, the time period between hydrotesting and operations can be unpredictable and may extend for months. Historical data has shown that significant corrosion issues can arise as a result of residual hydrotest water. For a piggable pipeline, an aqueous solution of VCI is pushed down the pipeline between two pigs after completion of the hydrotest operation. This provides corrosion mitigation until the line is put into service. For an unpiggable pipeline, the low sections where residual hydrotest water may collect after draining are identified and an aqueous VCI solution is added at nearby high points such that the inhibitor solution will flow into the low sections, thereby treating the residual water with inhibitor.

For pipeline sections that are being idled, the low-lying sections are identified, and an inhibitor solution is added at nearby high points to fill the low-lying sections to a predetermined depth.

Aboveground storage tanks (soilside bottom) – The bottoms of aboveground storage tanks are typically coated on the inside (product side) to prevent corrosion. The other side of the bottom (soilside) is not coated and the unprotected steel rests directly on a foundation. There are various styles of foundations: a concrete ringwall with a sand bed and a liner; a hard pad, such as concrete or asphalt; a double bottom; and finally simple soil. VCIs are applied via various methods depending on the tank foundation.

For tanks with a concrete ringwall with a sand bed and a liner, the VCI is typically installed as an aqueous solution. The solution is either injected at minimal pressure through the leak detection ports (and then the solution distributes through the sand primarily via capillary action), or through a preinstalled distribution system of perforated pipes. The tank can be in or out of service.

Various options are available for a tank on a hard pad, depending on whether the tank is in or out of service. For in-service tanks, a ring of perforated pipes is installed along the edge of the chime and sealed with a membrane; this creates an enclosed space between the tank base and the foundation pad for VCI distribution. The VCI is provided as a powder in mesh sleeves threaded into the perforated pipes. Once the VCI is depleted, these sleeves are replaced with new ones.

For a tank that is out of service with the floor removed, grooves are cut into the hard pad. A channel is also cut from the end of each groove to extend beyond the tank chime. A perforated pipe with a mesh cover is laid at the bottom of each groove, which is then filled with sand. The tank bottom is then installed as normal. The VCI is supplied as a powder in mesh sleeves that are installed in the perforated pipes. The ends of the perforated pipes are sealed. Upon depletion of the VCI, the mesh sleeves are removed and replaced with new ones.

For a tank that is out of service without the floor removed, the typical approach is to inject the VCI as an aqueous solution through ports installed in the floor, often using the helium ports that were previously used to verify the integrity of the tank floor.

Double-bottom tanks typically have one of two geometries. In the first, the space between the two floors has a liner and a sand bed. For this geometry, the VCI is supplied as an aqueous solution, which is injected through the leak detection ports. In the second, the space has a liner and a concrete pad with radial slots. (This style of double bottom is often called an 'El Segundo double bottom'.) For an El Segundo bottom that is in service, the VCI is again supplied as an aqueous solution injected through the leak detection ports. The ports are sealed closed and the solution is allowed to stand for a short period of time. The ports are then opened and the solution is drained, leaving a VCI residue on the interior surface, which provides the corrosion protection. For an El Segundo bottom that is out of service, perforated pipes are installed into the grooves in the concrete that have leak detection ports. Mesh sleeves containing inhibitor powder are inserted into the perforated pipes and the leak detection ports are closed.

Aboveground storage tanks (roofs) – The headspace of aboveground storage tanks can be an aggressive environment, especially in tanks storing crude oil due to the acidic species typically found in sour crude. Corrosion protection is supplied via a system of dispensers attached to ports installed on the tank roof. (Ports and shut-off valves are installed when the tank is out of service.) Bottles containing the VCI are placed in the dispenser, and the shut-off valves are opened. The VCI has a high vapor pressure such that the inhibitor will saturate the airspace within the dispenser and then will diffuse through the open port into the storage tank headspace.

Oils – VCIs in oils are most commonly used for the protection of oil-containing systems like engines or hydraulics during intermittent use or during longer-term storage (mothballing). The VCI-treated oil is typically added to the existing oil, and the unit is run to fully circulate the treated oil throughout the system. The system is then shut off for storage. VCI-treated oil can also be fogged into void spaces within a system or enclosed space.

Interior of large enclosed spaces – VCIs have been used to protect the interiors of equipment such as tanks, vessels, boilers, piping, and heat exchangers, especially for interior voids and recesses during storage or transportation. Common application methods include fogging or blowing VCI powder into the interior cavity, or placing the powder in packet form within the space. For smaller volumes, the packets are simply distributed within the space. For larger volumes, the packets are attached to leads that are then hung at the perimeter of the space.

Water treatment – Aqueous VCI solutions flush and rinse pipelines, pumps, manifolds, enclosed pits, and heat exchangers as preparation for storage.

Specialty covers – VCI film covers protect flanges, valves, and other equipment in harsh environments such as chemical processing plants and offshore platforms.

== See also ==
- Corrosion engineering
- Cosmoline
- Desiccant
