= Waterproofing =

Process of making an object or structure waterproof or water-resistant

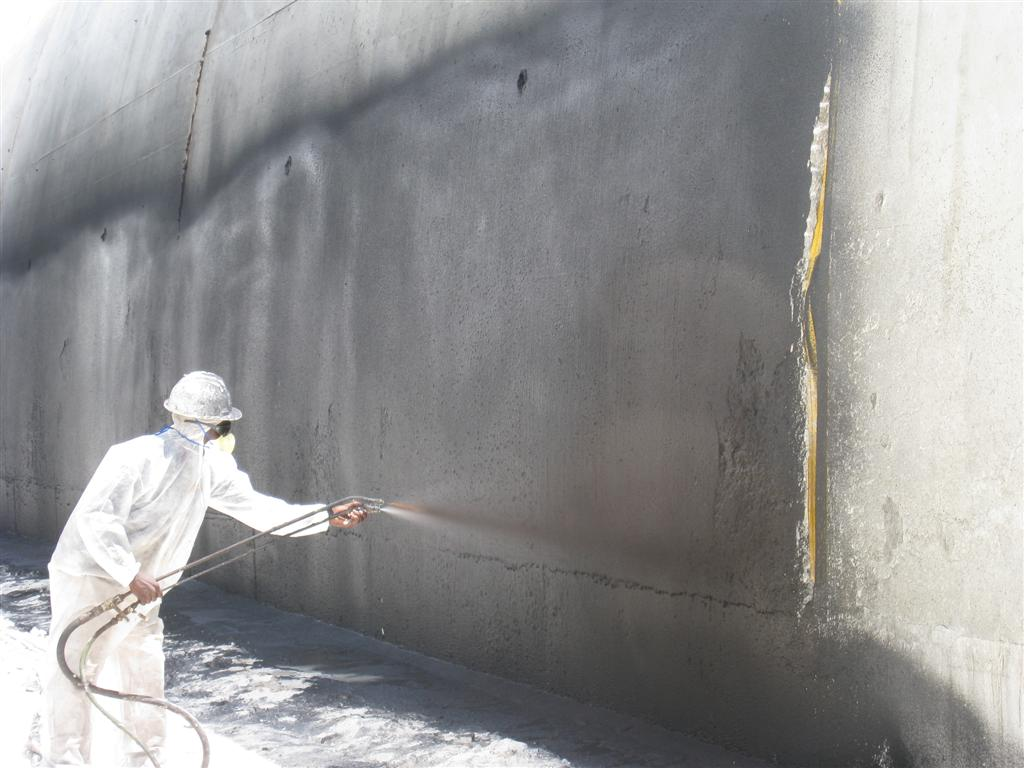
Waterproofing conducted on the exterior of a freeway tunnel

Waterproofing is the process of making an object, person or structure water-resistant so that it remains relatively unaffected by water or resists the ingress of water under specified conditions. Such items may be used in wet environments or underwater to specified depths.

Water-resistant and waterproof often refer to resistance to penetration of water in its liquid state and possibly under pressure, whereas damp proof refers to resistance to humidity or dampness. Permeation of water vapour through a material or structure is reported as a moisture vapor transmission rate (MVTR).

The hulls of boats and ships were once waterproofed by applying tar or pitch. Modern items may be waterproofed by applying water-repellent coatings or by sealing seams with gaskets or o-rings.

Waterproofing is used in reference to building structures (such as basements, decks, or wet areas), watercraft, canvas, clothing (raincoats or waders), electronic devices and paper packaging (such as cartons for liquids).

== In construction ==
In construction, a building or structure is waterproofed with the use of membranes and coatings to protect contents and structural integrity. The waterproofing of the building envelope in construction specifications is listed under 07 - Thermal and Moisture Protection within MasterFormat 2004, by the Construction Specifications Institute, and includes roofing and waterproofing materials.

In building construction, waterproofing is a fundamental aspect of creating a building envelope, which is a controlled environment. The roof covering materials, siding, foundations, and all of the various penetrations through these surfaces must be water-resistant and sometimes waterproof. Roofing materials are generally designed to be water-resistant and shed water from a sloping roof, but in some conditions, such as ice damming and on flat roofs, the roofing must be waterproof. Many types of waterproof membrane systems are available, including felt paper or tar paper with asphalt or tar to make a built-up roof, other bituminous waterproofing, ethylene propylene diene monomer EPDM rubber, hypalon, polyvinyl chloride, liquid roofing, and more.

Walls are not subjected to standing water, and the water-resistant membranes used as housewraps are designed to be porous enough to let moisture escape. Walls also have vapor barriers or air barriers. Damp proofing is another aspect of waterproofing. Masonry walls are built with a damp-proof course to prevent rising damp, and the concrete in foundations needs to be damp-proofed or waterproofed with a liquid coating, basement waterproofing membrane (even under the concrete slab floor where polyethylene sheeting is commonly used), or an additive to the concrete.

Tanking of a basement below the water table: a pre-applied waterproofing membrane fixed to the shoring wall before the concrete wall is cast, with dewatering wells lowering the groundwater level (Tel Aviv, 2013)

Within the waterproofing industry, below-ground waterproofing is generally divided into two areas:

- Tanking: This is waterproofing used where the below-ground structure will be sitting in the water table continuously or periodically. This causes hydrostatic pressure on both the membrane and structure and requires full encapsulation of the basement structure in a tanking membrane, under the slab and walls.
- Damp proofing: This is waterproofing used where the water table is lower than the structure and there is good free-draining fill. The membrane deals with the shedding of water and the ingress of water vapor only, with no hydrostatic pressure. Generally, this incorporates a damp proof membrane (DPM) to the walls with a polythene DPM under the slab. With higher grade DPM, some protection from short-term Hydrostatic pressure can be gained by transitioning the higher quality wall DPM to the slab polythene under the footing rather than at the footing face.

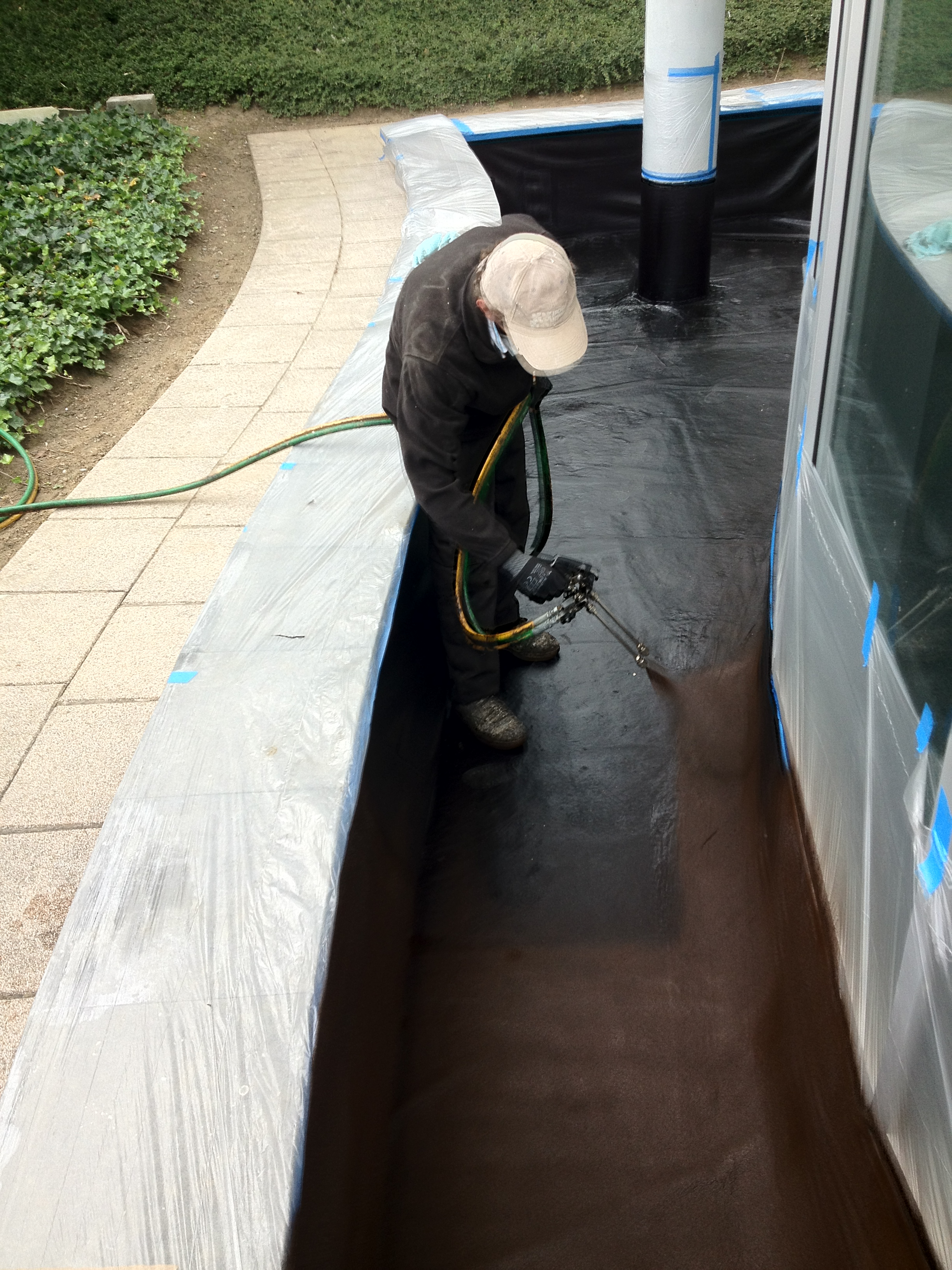
Waterproofing with two component system

In buildings using earth sheltering, too much humidity can be a potential problem, so waterproofing is critical. Water seepage can lead to mold growth, causing significant damage and air quality issues. Properly waterproofing foundation walls is required to prevent deterioration and seepage.

Another specialized area of waterproofing is rooftop decks and balconies. Waterproofing systems have become quite sophisticated and are a very specialized area. Failed waterproof decks, whether made of polymer or tile, are one of the leading causes of water damage to building structures and personal injury when they fail. Major problems occur in the construction industry when improper products are used for the wrong application. While the term waterproof is used for many products, each of them has a very specific area of application, and when manufacturer specifications and installation procedures are not followed, the consequences can be severe. Another factor is the impact of expansion and contraction on waterproofing systems for decks. Decks constantly move with changes in temperatures, putting stress on the waterproofing systems. One of the leading causes of waterproof deck system failures is the movement of underlying substrates (plywood) that causes too much stress on the membranes, failing the system. While beyond the scope of this reference document, waterproofing of decks and balconies is a complex of many complimentary elements. These include the waterproofing membrane used, adequate slope-drainage, proper flashing details, and proper construction materials.

The penetrations through a building envelope must be built in a way such that water does not enter the building, such as using flashing and special fittings for pipes, vents, wires, etc. Some caulkings are durable, but many are unreliable for waterproofing.

Also, many types of geomembranes are available to control water, gases, or pollution.

From the late 1990s to the 2010s, the construction industry has had technological advances in waterproofing materials, including integral waterproofing systems and more advanced membrane materials. Integral systems such as hycrete work within the matrix of a concrete structure, giving the concrete itself a waterproof quality. There are two main types of integral waterproofing systems: the hydrophilic and the hydrophobic systems. A hydrophilic system typically uses a crystallization technology that replaces the water in the concrete with insoluble crystals. Various brands available in the market claim similar properties, but not all can react with a wide range of cement hydration by-products and thus require caution. Hydrophobic systems use concrete sealers or even fatty acids to block pores within the concrete, preventing water passage.

Sometimes, the same materials used to keep water out of buildings are used to keep water in, such as a pool or pond liners.

New membrane materials seek to overcome shortcomings in older methods like polyvinyl chloride (PVC) and high-density polyethylene (HDPE). Generally, new technology in waterproof membranes relies on polymer-based materials that are very adhesive to create a seamless barrier around the outside of a structure.

Waterproofing should not be confused with roofing, since roofing cannot necessarily withstand hydrostatic head while waterproofing can.

The standards for waterproofing bathrooms in domestic construction have improved over the years, due in large part to the general tightening of building codes.

== In clothing ==
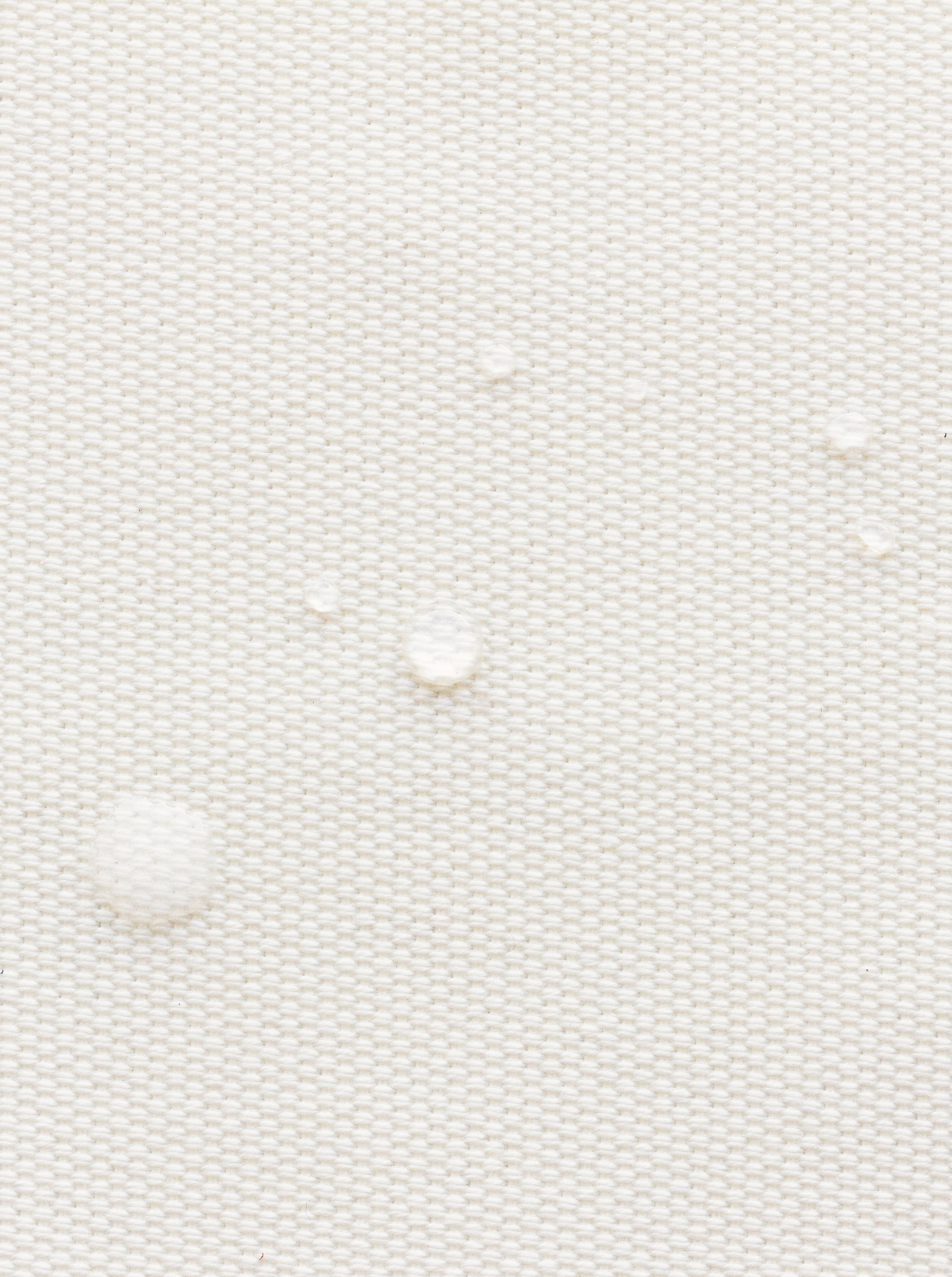
A wax coating makes this Manila hemp waterproof.

Some garments, and tents, are designed to give greater or lesser protection against rain. For urban use, raincoats and jackets are used; for outdoor activities in rough weather, there is a range of hiking apparel. Typical descriptions are "showerproof", "water resistant", and "waterproof". These terms are not precisely defined. A showerproof garment will usually be treated with a water-resisting coating but is not rated to resist a specific hydrostatic head. This is suitable for protection against light rain, but after a short time, water will penetrate. A water-resistant garment is similar, perhaps slightly more resistant to water, but also not rated to resist a specific hydrostatic head. A garment described as waterproof will have a water-repellent coating, with the seams also taped to prevent water ingress there. Better waterproof garments have a membrane lining designed to keep water out but allow trapped moisture to escape ("breathability")—a totally waterproof garment would retain body sweat and become clammy. Waterproof garments specify their hydrostatic rating, ranging from 1,500 for light rain to 20,000 for heavy rain.

Waterproof garments are intended for use in weather conditions which are often windy as well as wet and are usually also wind resistant.

Footwear can also be made waterproof by using a variety of methods, including but not limited to, the application of beeswax, waterproofing spray, or mink oil.

== In other objects ==
Waterproofing methods have been implemented in many types of objects, including paper packaging, cosmetics, and, more recently, consumer electronics. Electronic devices used in military and severe commercial environments are routinely conformally coated in accordance with IPC-CC-830 to resist moisture and corrosion, but encapsulation is needed to become truly waterproof. Even though it is possible to find waterproof wrapping or other types of protective cases for electronic devices, a new technology enabled the release of diverse waterproof smartphones and tablets in 2013. This method is based on a special nanotechnology coating a thousand times thinner than a human hair which protects electronic equipment from damage due to the penetration of water. Several manufacturers use the nano coating method on their smartphones, tablets, and digital cameras.

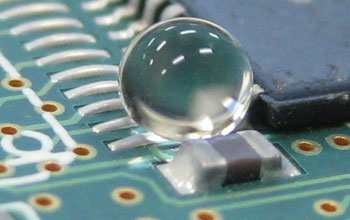
A water droplet on a superhydrophobic surface

A 2013 study found that nanotextured surfaces using cone forms produce highly water-repellent surfaces. These nanocone textures are superhydrophobic (extremely water-hating).

== Applications ==
Waterproof packaging or other types of protective cases for electronic devices can be found. A new technology enabled the release of various waterproof smartphones and tablets in 2013. A study from 2013 found that nano-textured surfaces using cone shapes produce highly water-repellent surfaces. These "nanocone" textures are superhydrophobic.

== Standards ==
- ASTM C1127 – Standard Guide for Use of High Solids Content, Cold Liquid-Applied Elastomeric Waterproofing Membrane with an Integral Wearing Surface
- ASTM D779 – Standard Test Method for Determining the Water Vapor Resistance of Sheet Materials in Contact with Liquid Water by the Dry Indicator Method
- ASTM D2099 – Standard Test Method for Dynamic Water Resistance of Shoe Upper Leather by the Maeser Water Penetration Tester
- ASTM D3393 – Standard Specification for Coated Fabrics Waterproofness
- D6135 – Standard Practice for Application of Self-Adhering Modified Bituminous Waterproofing
- ASTM D7281 – Standard Test Method for Determining Water Migration Resistance Through Roof Membranes
- British Standards Institution BS.8102:2009 – "Protection of Below Ground Structures against Water from the Ground".
- IEC 60529 – Degrees of protection provided by enclosures (IP Code)
- ISO 2281 – Horology — Water-resistant watches

== See also ==
- Saint-Gobain
- Bituminous waterproofing
- Building insulation
- Durable water repellent (DWR) coatings
- IP Code (used on mobile phones)
- Sika AG
- Soundproofing
- Truscon Laboratories
- Water Resistant mark
- Waterproof fabric
- Waterproof paper
