= Anchor channel =

Fastener in reinforced concrete construction

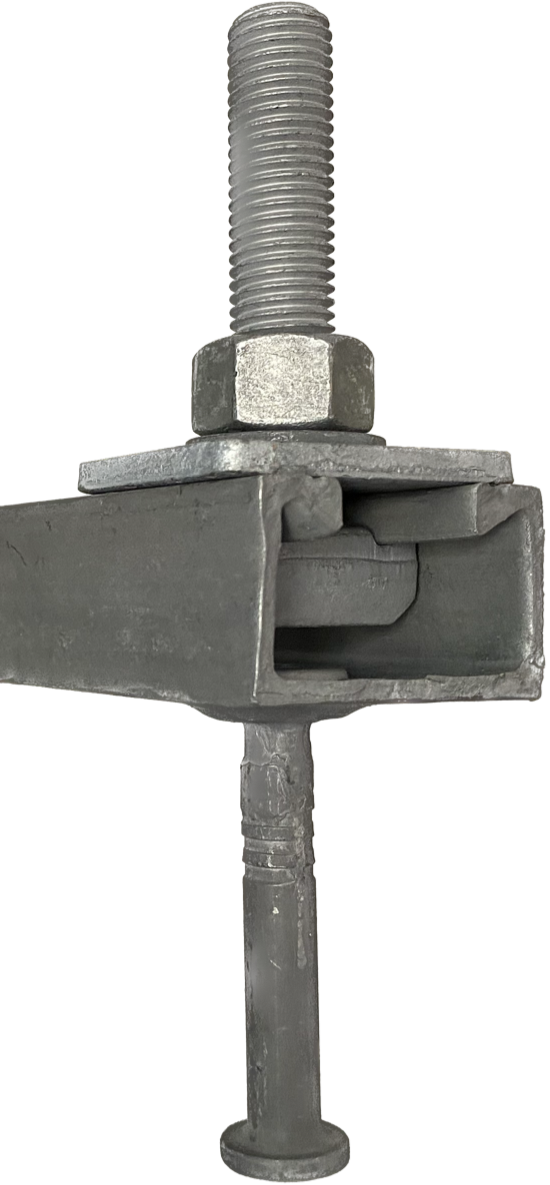
Anchor channel, consisting of hot-rolled profile and riveted anchor, with channel bolt

Anchor channels, invented by Anders Jordahl in 1913, are steel channels cast flush in reinforced concrete elements to allow the installation of channel bolts for the fastening of components.

Anchor channels consist of steel C-shaped channels and anchors (mostly headed studs) which are connected to the channel by welding or riveting/forging. The channels are supplied with a filler, typically made of polyethylene foam, to prevent concrete from leaking into the channel when the concrete is poured.

The system includes T-shaped bolts which are called channel bolts in the regulations, however, are commonly known as T-bolts. They are also called hammer head bolts, serrated bolts or hook-headed bolts based on their shape and function. The T-bolts are inserted into the anchor channel after the filler has been removed. The T-bolts can be moved along the channel length to allow for adjustment. The adjustment of the T-bolt location is required to compensate for construction tolerances or for a change in use for a particular application. The T-bolt is then tightened to the required torque to fasten a component.

== Types ==
Hot-rolled and cold-formed anchor channels are available depending on the manufacturing method of the open profiles.

To provide corrosion resistance, anchor channels and channel bolts can be provided in electroplated, hot-dipped galvanized or stainless steel.

Anchor channels and T-bolts can be either smooth or serrated. Serrated channels and T-bolts can resist loads in the longitudinal direction of the channel by means of a mechanical interlock. This is particularly useful in the case of seismic and dynamic loads.

== History ==
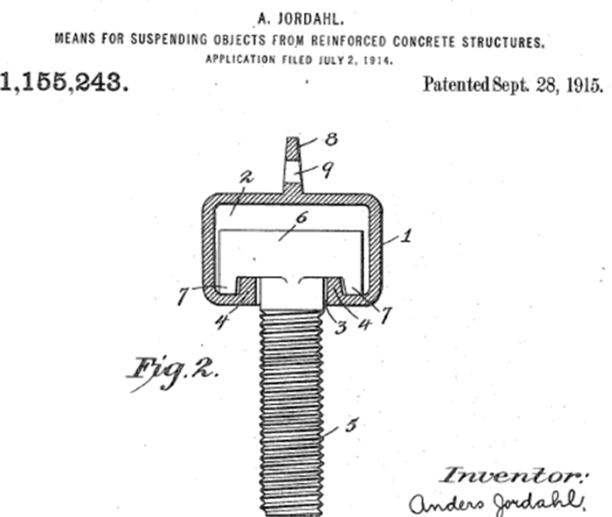
Patent drawing Anders Jordahl: Anchor channel with channel bolt (United States Patent and Trademark Office, 1,155,243)

Concrete and iron reinforced concrete construction at the beginning of the 20th century required new methods of attaching various components to reinforced concrete elements. For smaller loads, trapezoidal wooden battens with bent nails were cast-in. Larger loads could only be attached with special claws when steel girders were embedded in concrete. Another development was S-shaped steel beams into which hook bolts were hung. To enable fastening in reinforced concrete elements that is independent of cast-in steel girders, Anders Jordahl developed a tied back, C-shaped "slotted rebar" with T-shaped hook-headed bolts in 1913. At that time, Anders Jordahl was the German representative for the Kahn System (Kahn bar), a product of the Truscon by Albert Kahn and Julius Kahn. Jordahl's new fastener was patented in several countries in the following years. Since 1925 the term "anchor channel" has been used, and industrial production has been carried out. This was followed by further developments by various manufacturers, in particular Halfen (now part of CRH) and Jordahl.

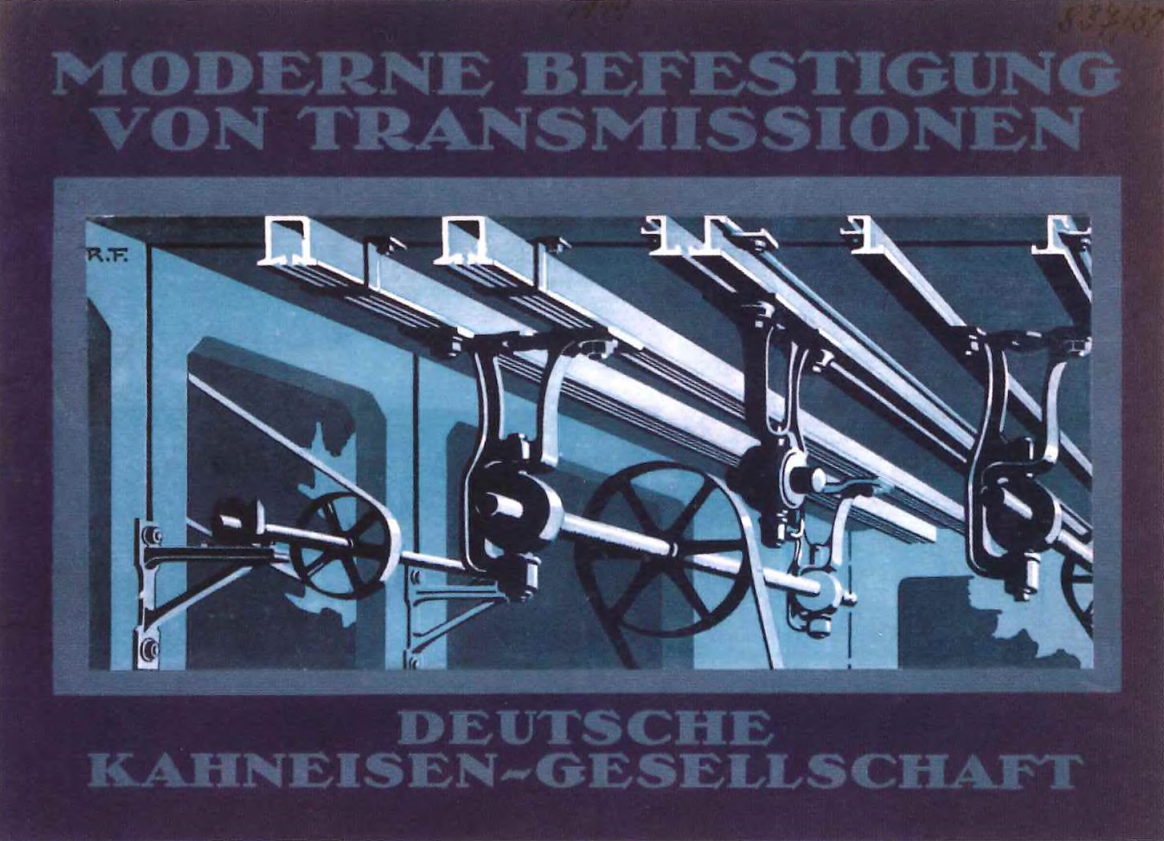
Illustration of employment in factories

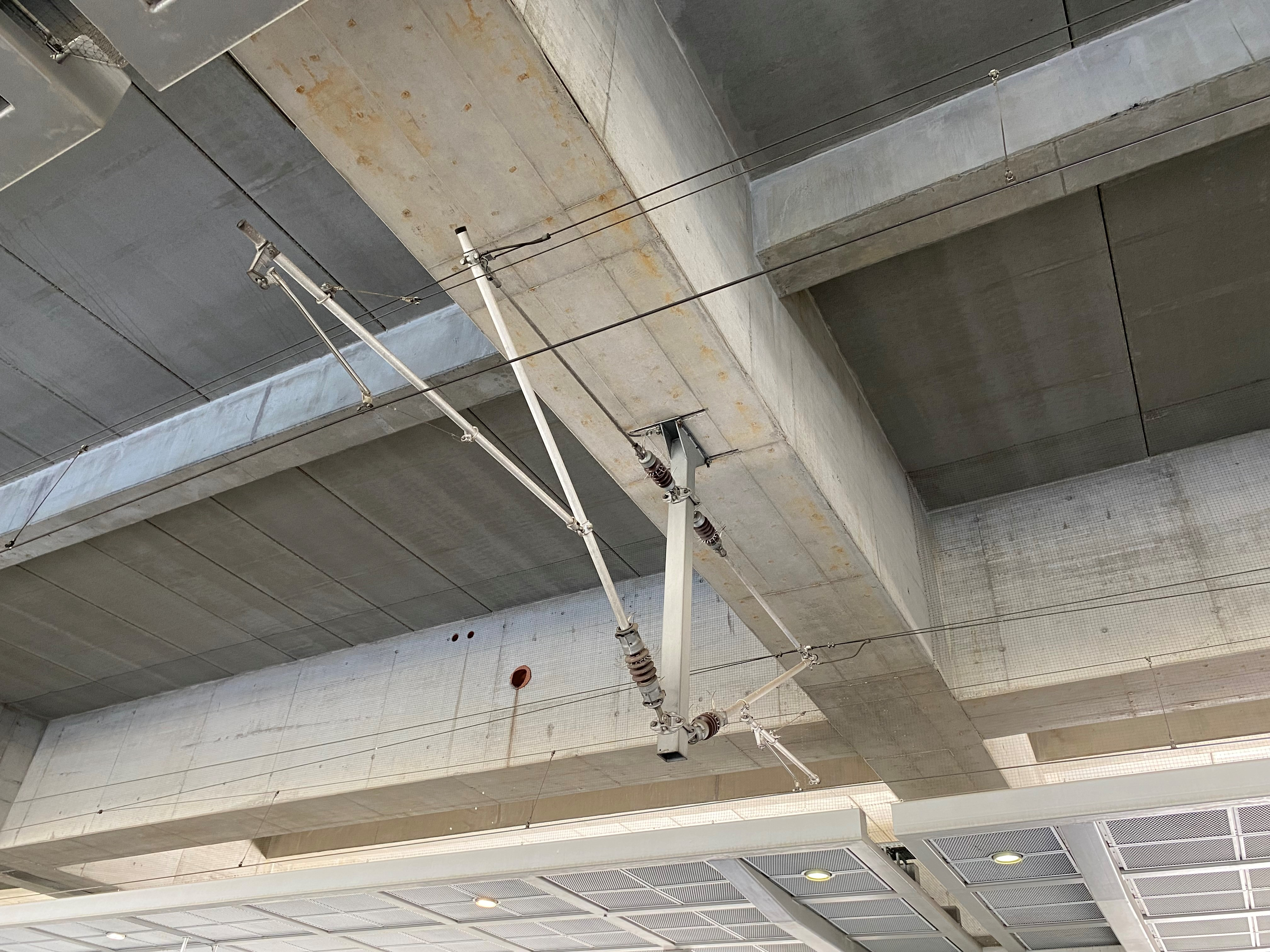
Photo of employment in infrastructures

== Regulations ==
Anchor channels and channel bolts are qualified in Europe according to EAD 330008-XX-0601 and designed according to EN 1992–4. In the US, the system is qualified according to Acceptance Criteria AC232 and designed according to AC232 and ACI 318. The qualification is certified in Europe by a European Technical Assessment (ETA) and in the US by an Evaluation Service Report (ESR). These specifications also contain the product-specific parameters required for the design, which is determined in the course of the approval process.

The regulations in Europe and the USA are almost identical. In countries that are following European regulations with regard to fastenings in concrete (e.g. Malaysia, Singapore, Australia) ETAs, and in countries that follow US-American regulations with regard to fastenings in concrete (e.g. Canada, Mexico, Indonesia, South Korea, Taiwan, New Zealand) ESRs are accepted and referenced.

== Applications ==
Anchor channels are used, for example, to fasten glass curtain wall panels, precast concrete parts, utility lines, brick facades, reinforced concrete facades, brackets, elevator guiding rails, canopies or other components, e.g. in plant construction. Curved channels are used in tunnel construction, e.g. in tubings, used for the fastening of media or overhead wire. Depending on the manufacturer's product range, suitable anchor channels can be used for a wide variety of construction applications with different requirements for load-bearing capacity, fire protection and corrosion protection.

== Literature ==
- R. Eligehausen, R. Mallée, J. Silva: Anchorage in concrete construction. Beton-Kalender, Ernst & Sohn, Berlin 2006, ISBN 978-3-433-01143-0.
- R. Eligehausen, J. Asmus, D. Lotze, M. Potthoff: Ankerschienen. Beton-Kalender, Ernst & Sohn, Berlin 2007, ISBN 978-3-433-02916-9.
