= Anders Jordahl =

American-norwegian businessman and artist

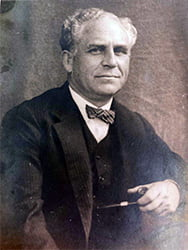
- Jordahl ca. 1945
- Born: 4 April 1878; Elverum Municipality, Norway
- Died: 18 February 1969 (aged 90); East Millstone, New Jersey, US
- Education: Trondhjems Tekniske Læreanstalt
- Occupations: Businessman; Artist

Signature
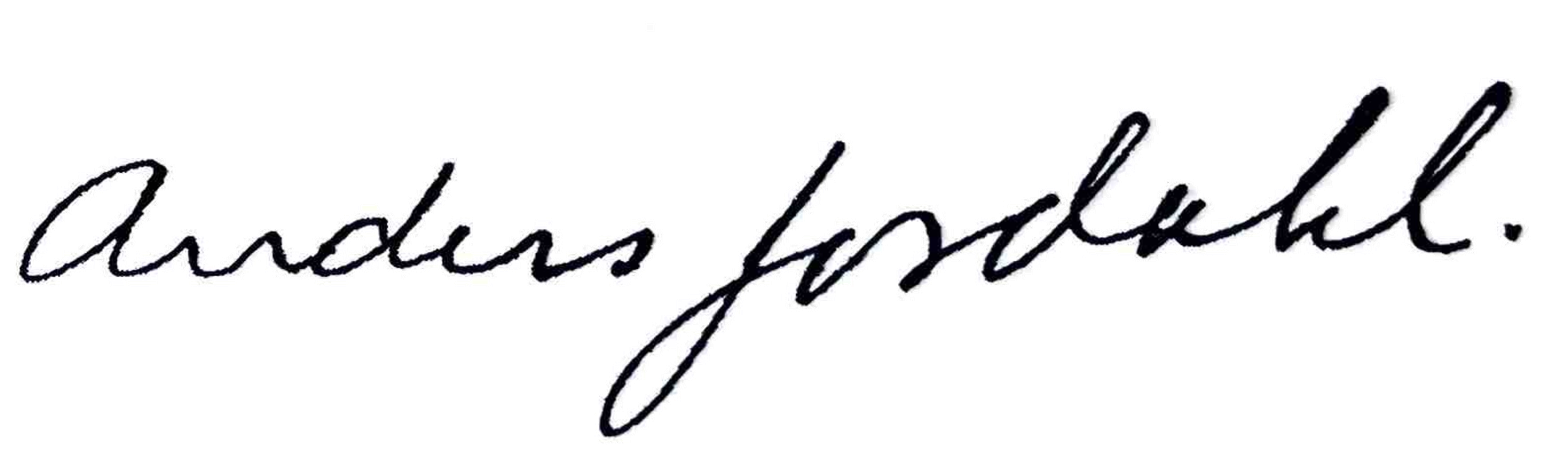

Anders Olsen Jordahl (April 4, 1878 – February 18, 1969) was a Norwegian-American civil engineer, inventor, entrepreneur and artist.

== Life ==
Anders Jordahl was born in Elverum Municipality in Hedmark County, Norway. His parents were Ole Jordahl and Mary Jordahl (née Furer). His father was a schoolteacher. The family originated from the district of Nordmøre. He studied engineering at Trondhjems Tekniske Læreanstalt, nowadays the Norwegian University of Science and Technology (NTNU), in Trondheim.

After emigrating to the United States in 1901, the young Norwegian civil engineer met the young Swedish civil engineer Ivar Kreuger. Sharing an interest in reinforced concrete building design and construction, they worked together in the building industry in the United States and abroad for a few years. For a short time, they managed a bar in the Carlton Hotel in Johannesburg, South Africa.

In 1907, Kreuger acquired the European marketing rights for the Kahn trussed bar, the fundamental part of the Kahn system for reinforced concrete constructions. The Kahn system was invented by civil engineer Julius Kahn in 1903, enabling his brother, the architect Albert Kahn, to sketch pioneering structures. In the following years, Jordahl mostly stayed in Germany and Sweden, for example, to work for Kreuger & Toll to construct the Stockholm Olympic Stadium.

In 1913, Jordahl and Kreuger founded the company Deutsche Kahneisen Gesellschaft Jordahl & Co. in Berlin, Germany, which was later renamed as Jordahl GmbH. Through this company, Jordahl invented, developed and patented the anchor channel for reinforced concrete buildings, allowing components to be anchored in concrete elements.

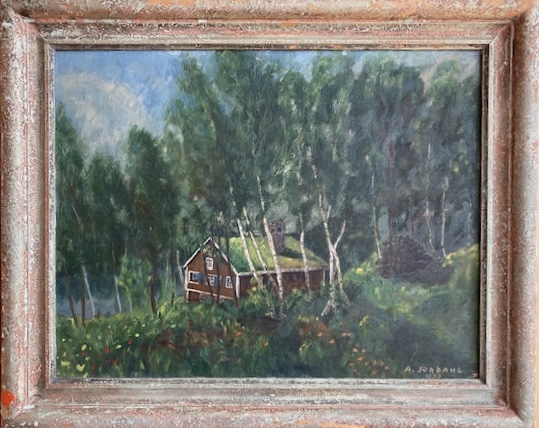
Anders Jordahl: The Hut, 1956

Jordahl lived in Berlin until he relocated to New York City in 1919 to establish Jordahl & Co. in New York, representing Kreuger & Toll in the United States. He became a close confidant of Kreuger, who mentioned Jordahl in his suicide note in 1932. In that same year, Jordahl moved to Canada and later back to the United States.

In 1941, Jordahl moved from Greenwich, Connecticut, to East Millstone, New Jersey. During his free time, he was painting landscapes and still-lifes in oil. He died there as a widower of Mary Dyas Jordahl in 1969; they had a daughter Helen ("Sunny") Prescott LeVaillant Nordquist. Jordahl was a member of the Engineers Club of New York City and a member of the Salmagundi Club, the oldest artists' club in America.
