= Julius Kahn (inventor) =

American inventor (1874–1942)

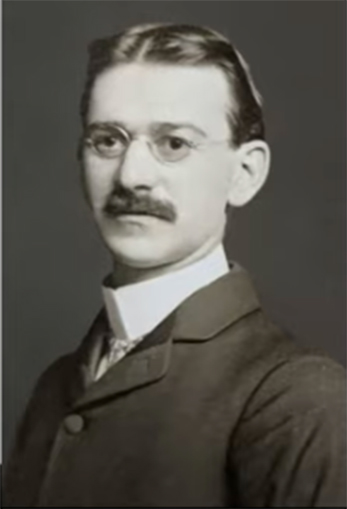
- Born: March 8, 1874; Münstereifel, Kingdom of Prussia
- Died: November 4, 1942 (aged 68); Cleveland, Ohio, U.S.
- Education: University of Michigan
- Occupation: Engineer
- Known for: Kahn system
- Spouse: Margaret Kohut
- Children: Gisela, Katherine, Julius Jr.
- Relatives: Albert Kahn (brother)

Signature
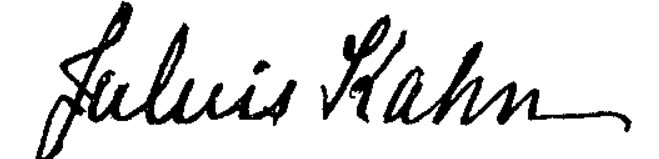

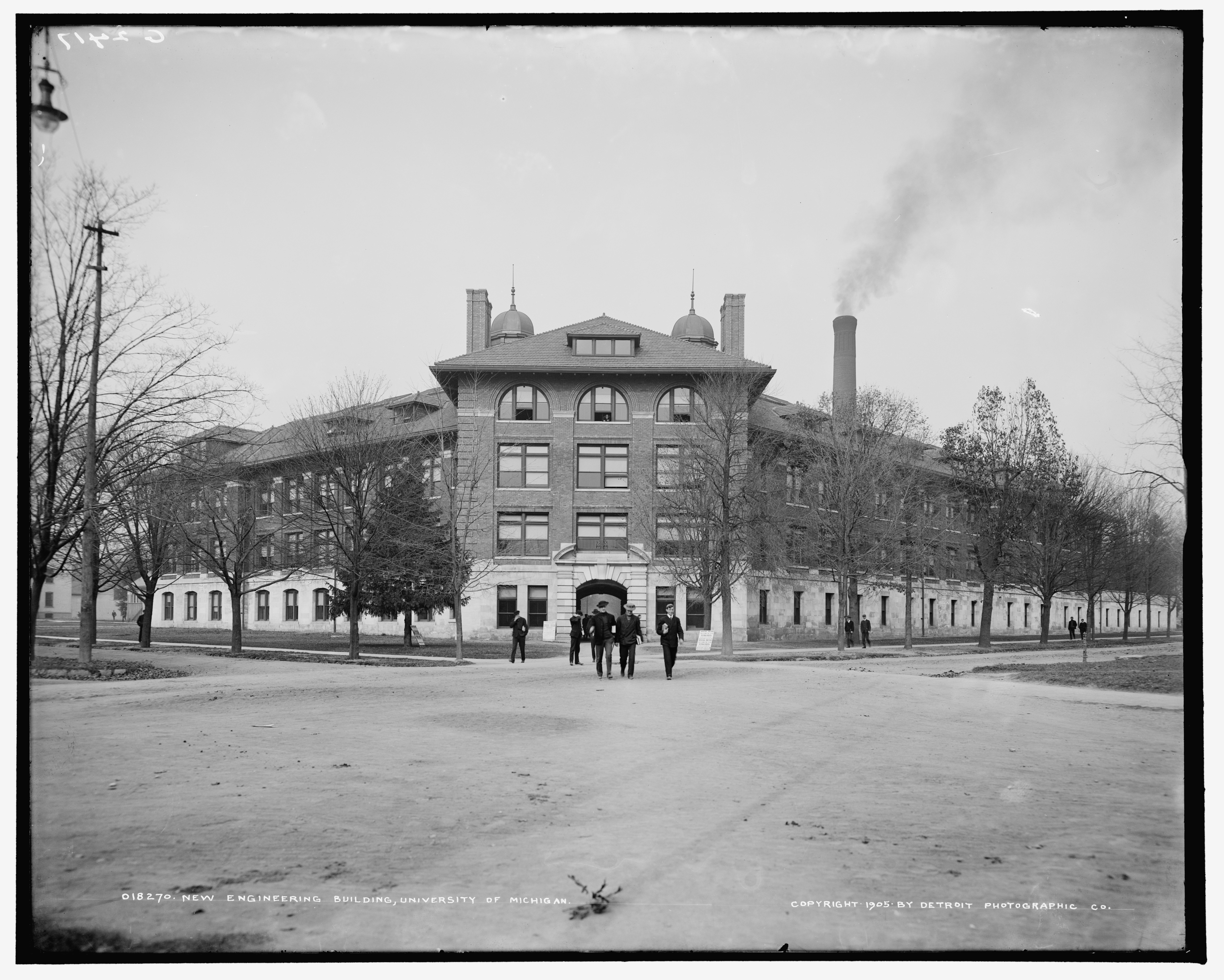
University of Michigan (Ann Arbor) Engineering Building (1905)

Julius Kahn (March 8, 1874 – November 4, 1942) was an American engineer, industrialist, and manufacturer. He was the inventor of the Kahn system, a reinforced concrete engineering technique for building construction. The Kahn system, which he patented in 1903, was used worldwide for housing, factories, offices and industrial buildings. He formed the Trussed Concrete Steel Company as a manufacturing source for his inventions. He also founded United Steel Company and was chairman of Truscon Laboratories.

== Early life and education ==
Kahn was born in Münstereifel, Germany, March 8, 1874. He immigrated to the United States with his family in 1880, entering at the port of Baltimore, Maryland, where they briefly lived. They continued to Detroit, Michigan, where he was raised, along with five brothers and two sisters.

Their father Joseph (1860–1924) was a rabbi and ran a restaurant where Julius worked; he also sold newspapers. Mother Rosalie was skilled in music and art. Kahn's elementary education was in Detroit Public Schools. He completed the normal four-year high school curriculum in three years.

Kahn, assisted financially by his older brother, architect Albert, attended the University of Michigan. He received a Bachelor of Science and a degree in Civil Engineering in 1896.

== Career ==
=== Reinforced concrete and Truscon ===
After graduating from the University of Michigan, Kahn began his career as an engineering draftsman for the Union Bridge Company of New York. He worked as an engineer for both the United States Navy and the U.S. Army Corps of Engineers from 1896 to 1903. Kahn also was employed by C. W. Hunt Company of New York. In 1900, Kahn moved to Japan for two years, laboring in engineering, construction, and maintenance of iron and sulfur mines.

Kahn returned to Detroit in 1903, joining Albert Kahn Associates, an architectural firm founded by his brother Albert in 1895. Kahn's first assignment was collaborating with key architect Ernest Wilby in Ann Arbor on the University of Michigan's new College of Engineering building. Kahn's focus was testing specific materials for sufficient strength in supporting the new building.

Kahn and Wilby wanted to use reinforced concrete for the building's floors, in place of traditional wood supports. Kahn had previous experience in reinforced concrete with the U.S. Army Corps of Engineers. During the construction of U.S. War College building in Washington, D.C., he initiated methods improving the then existing technology of reinforced concrete by beginning work developing the Kahn system of steel bars. This new concept for reinforced concrete steel bars was the basis of the steel production company he later founded.

Kahn understood the structural challenges inherent in the existing method of concrete reinforcement used at the end of the nineteenth century. The main problem was slippage of the steel within the hardened concrete, which weakened the structure. He experimented in his brother's basement, where he developed an improved type of reinforced beam called "the Kahn Bar". Kahn patented his invention in 1903, the first of more than 75 patents awarded to him.

The Jordahl (Jordahl GmbH) Company’s founders, Norwegian Anders Jordahl and his Swedish partner Ivar Kreuger, acquired the marketing rights to the Kahn system in Europe in 1907. Today, the company attributes the “… seeds of its founding …” to Albert and Julius Kahn’s passion for concrete. Kahn formed Trussed Concrete Steel Company (Truscon) to manufacture his beams. He was the president, but spent much of his time in the design room. The company was headquartered in Detroit, with manufacturing in Youngstown, Ohio. Kahn chose Youngstown in 1907 as the ideal location because the city's proximity to steel production in Mahoning County and reduced shipping costs.

=== Management ===
Kahn served as a director of the Mahoning Bank, the First National Bank, and Dollar Bank. In 1927, he was elected chairman of the Youngstown Chamber of Commerce grade elimination committee, and a director of the streetcar committee in 1928. He was the president of an eponymous realty firm in Detroit. In 1930, Kahn was honorary chairman of the Allied Jewish financial campaign. He was also a member of several committees in metal-related industries, as well as a member of the proxy committee that opposed the merger of Youngstown Sheet & Tube Company with Bethlehem Steel.

Kahn was the founder of United Steel Company in Wooster, Ohio, and chairman of Truscon Laboratories in Detroit. He was president of Truscon Steel Company from its inception in 1905 until 1935, when it was taken over by Republic Steel Corporation. He then became a vice president for Republic, serving until 1939.

=== Writing and publishing ===
Kahn wrote several published articles on engineering and on the steel business. One article titled "Confidence and cooperation", discussed the ills of industry. Kahn was also a member of the American Society of Civil Engineers, which awarded him The Collingwood Prize for his paper "The Coal Hoists of the Calumet and Hecla Mining Company" in 1889.

== Inventions and impact ==
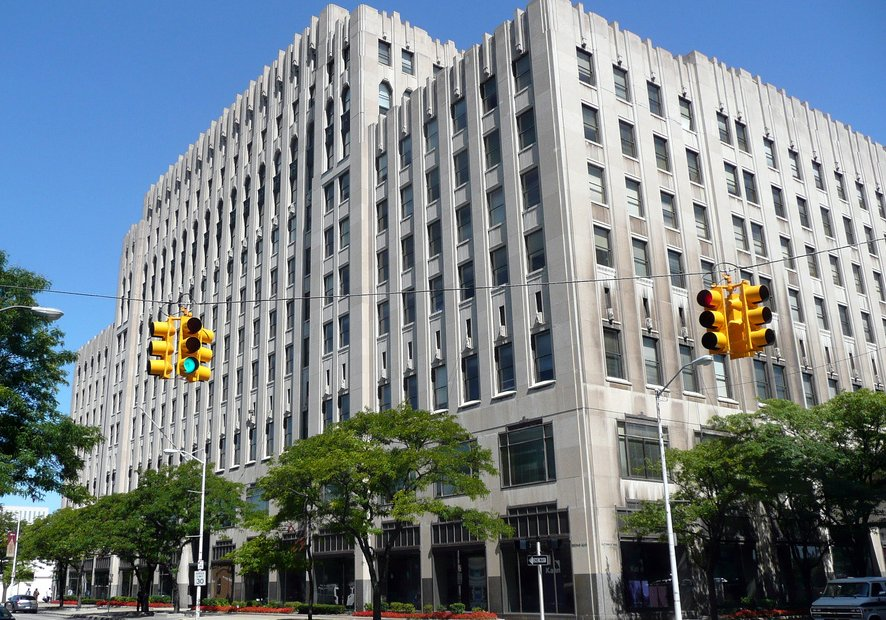
The Albert Kahn Building in Detroit, where Julius worked in fabrication designs

Kahn experimented and developed reinforced concrete construction materials, with at least 75 patented inventions in the field by 1934. His first patent was "Kahn Trussed Bar", also called "the Kahn Bar" or "Kahn Bar System", patented in 1903. The Kahn bar was a straight steel beam whose edges were slightly bent, resulting in improved stress distribution "wings" that increased tension strength. It was the principal product of the Trussed Concrete Steel Company, although the company manufactured many prefabricated steel products, as well as complete buildings — all used in construction around the world. Kahn's co-workers noted that he would stop whatever he was doing to write down an idea immediately, no matter what else was engaging him. Additionally, he encouraged Truscon employees with financial incentives to develop new and improved ideas to benefit the company. For example, employee David H. Morgan was financially rewarded for inventing a new type of airplane hangar door, subsequently manufactured by Truscon.

The Kahn system of reinforced concrete was adapted by his brother Albert Kahn, an architect, for the design and construction of industrial buildings. By 1939, Kahn's system was used in 134 U.S. cities and was adopted by builders in Africa, Europe, Canada, China, Brazil, and Mexico. The system was used in the first two automobile factories in the U.S., Packard and Cadillac, progenitors of the most prodigious industry of the 20th century. His unique engineering and construction method was also found in airplane plants, warehouses, docks, foundries, creameries, filtration plants, rubber factories, steel plants, silos, distilleries, smelters, and textile mills.

The steel-reinforced concrete automobile factory has been heralded as one of the architectural breakthroughs of the 20th century. Many named the 1905 Packard Motor Car Company’s building No. 10 in Detroit as the first edifice built for the largest and most swiftly growing industry in the early 1900s. Albert Kahn was the designer and architect for this use of the Kahn system in construction devoted entirely to the car. However, the first was actually the Cadillac Motor Car plant in Detroit. Ironically, Julius Kahn supervised the engineering and construction of both buildings, using his patented system to make essential contributions to the construction and automotive industries in the US.

There were two significant construction accidents in buildings using the Kahn system in the early 20th century. The first, in November 1906, occurred in Long Beach, California, when parts of the Bixby Hotel collapsed during construction. Also, that November, the Eastman Kodak Building in Rochester, New York, gave way. Investigations of both accidents found the quality of workmanship seriously at fault. Both queries came to the conclusion that the Kahn system was not to blame for either faulty design or errors; rather, poor construction techniques were responsible.

Trussed Concrete Steel Company manufactured a product with a brand name of Hy-Rib starting in 1909. It was a steel meshed sheathing with deep stiffening ribs. It was filled with cement or plaster and used for floors, walls, and ceilings of houses, factories, and commercial buildings. It was a product derived from the Kahn Trussed Bar for beams and columns of reinforced concrete. Hy-Rib products were also used in the construction of tunnels, conduits, flumes, culverts, silos, cisterns, chimneys, and water tanks. Its technology cut down on labor time in construction.

== Personal life and death ==
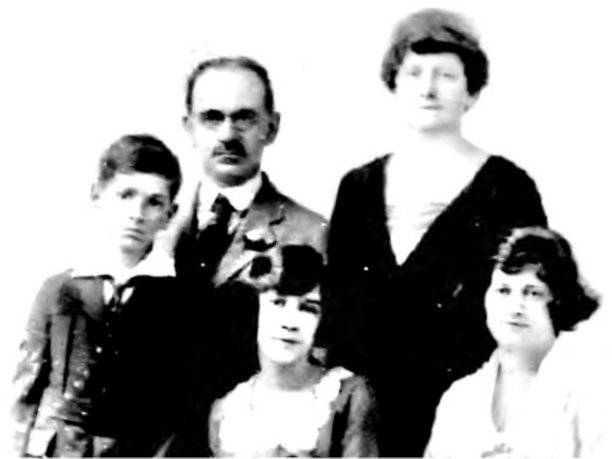
The Kahn family, 1921

Kahn married Margaret K. Kohut, daughter of rabbi Alexander Kohut, on December 23, 1903. Margaret was born in Hungary in 1876; later, her family immigrated to the US. The Kahns had three children: Gisela Kahn Gresser (1906–2000), Katherine Kay (1909–1954), and Julius Kahn Jr. (1912–2009), all born in Detroit. Kahn enjoyed a one-year retirement "to private life" in 1939. In 1940, he exited retirement and became an executive of another steel fabricating company. Kahn died at the age of 68 of pneumonia on November 4, 1942, in Cleveland, Ohio.

== Bibliography ==
- Bucci, Federico (2002). Albert Kahn: Architect of Ford. Princeton Architectural Press. ISBN 978-1-56898-343-1.
- Cody, Jeffrey W. (2005). Exporting American Architecture 1870–2000. Routledge. ISBN 978-1-135-80487-9.
- Ferry, W. Hawkins (1987) [1970]. The Legacy of Albert Kahn (reprint ed.). Wayne State University Press. ISBN 0-8143-1889-4.
- Matuz, Roger (2002). Albert Kahn: Builder of Detroit. Wayne State University Press. ISBN 0-8143-2957-8.
- "Municipal Engineering". Municipal Engineering. 20. Municipal Engineering Company. 1901. ISSN 0097-4129. LCCN sn82003917.
- Nelson, George (1939). Industrial architecture of Albert Kahn, Inc. Architectural Book Publishing Company. LCCN 39005868.
- Truscon (1917). Hy-Rib Handbook; roofs—floors—walls—sidings—partitions—ceilings—furring—silos—tanks—conduits, concrete without forms. Youngstown, Ohio: Trussed Concrete Steel Company. OCLC 33111897.
- Baldwin, Neil (2002). Henry Ford and the Jews: The Mass Production of Hate. Public Affairs. ISBN 978-1-58648-163-6.
- Darley, Gillian (2003). Factory. Reaktion Books. ISBN 978-1-86189-155-6.
- Olsen, Byron (2002). The American Auto Factory. MotorBooks International. ISBN 978-0-7603-1059-5.
- Smith, Terry (1994). Making the Modern: Industry, Art, and Design in America. University of Chicago Press. ISBN 978-0-226-76347-7.
