= Penetrating oil =

Low-viscosity oil

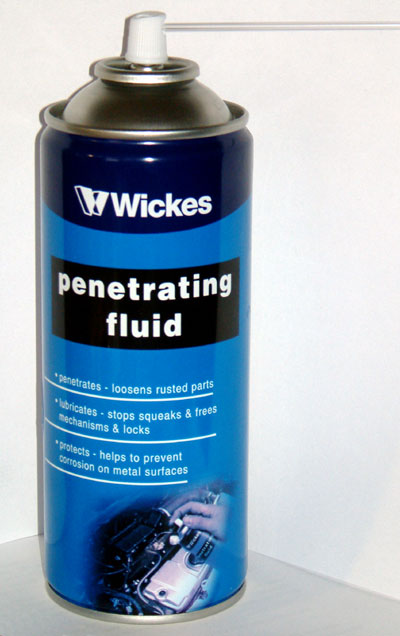
A 400 ml can of penetrating fluid from British retailer Wickes

Penetrating oil, also known as penetrating fluid, is a low-viscosity oil. It can be used to free rusted mechanical parts (such as nuts and bolts) so that they can be removed, because it can penetrate the narrow space between the threads of two parts. It can also be used as a cleaner; however, it should not be used as a general-purpose lubricant or a corrosion stopper. Using penetrating fluids as general-purpose lubricants is not advisable, because such oils are relatively volatile. As a result, much of the penetrating oil will evaporate in a short amount of time, leaving little residual lubricant.

Other uses include removing chewing gum and adhesive stickers, and lessening friction on metal-stringed musical instruments.
