= Albert Kahn Building =

- U.S. National Register of Historic Places
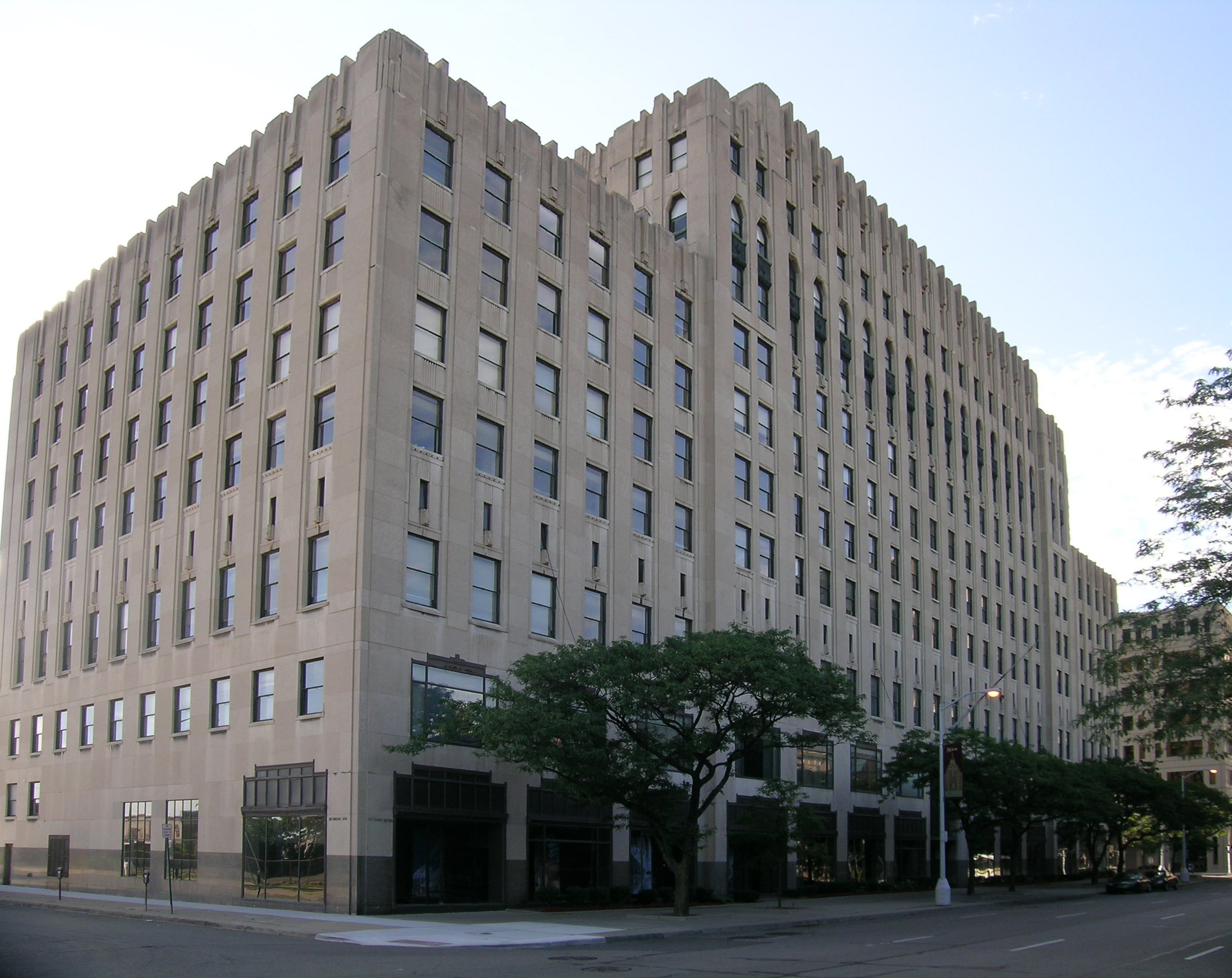
- Location: 7430 Second Avenue; Detroit, Michigan
- Coordinates: 42°22′15″N 83°4′38″W
- Built: 1930
- Architect: Albert Kahn
- Architectural style: Art Deco
- NRHP reference No.: 80001922
- Added to NRHP: October 14, 1980

The Albert Kahn Building, formerly New Center Building, is an office building located at 7430 Second Avenue in the New Center area of Detroit, Michigan completed in 1931. The building was listed on the National Register of Historic Places in 1980.

The New Center Building was built by the Fisher brothers (Frederick, Charles, William, Lawrence, Edward, Alfred and Howard) and designed by Albert Kahn. It is located diagonally across from the Fisher Building (also designed by Kahn and built by the Fishers). The ten-story building is architecturally similar to the Fisher Building, and the two are connected by an underground pedestrian tunnel. The building was originally designed to house office and retail space, but currently houses only offices. The building was renamed the Albert Kahn Building in 1988. From 1940 through 1980, part of the ground floor was occupied by Saks Fifth Avenue store number 4.

As in the Fisher Building, Kahn used high quality materials to construct the New Center Building, including polished marble lobby floors and brass elevator doors.

In June 2015, Southfield-based developer Redico LLC, in partnership with HFZ Capital Group of New York City and others purchased the Fisher Building and adjacent Albert Kahn Building, plus 2,000 parking spaces in two parking structures and three surface lots in New Center for $12.2 million at auction. Redico said the partnership plans to transition the two connected buildings into what it called a "true urban" mixed-use development, with a mix of office, retail, residential and entertainment uses. The multi-year project has a potential cost of $70 million to $80 million in addition to the purchase price.

In June 2018, A joint venture between Northern Equities, and Lutz Real Estate bought the Albert Kahn building for $9.5 million from The Platform. Redevelopment plans costing $58 million, will create 211 apartments, and more than 75,000 square feet (7,000 m^{2}) of retail, and commercial space, scheduled for completion in mid-2020.

== Tenants ==
- Detroit Public Schools: 3rd Floor
  - Office of College & Career Readiness and Office of Fine Arts
  - Office of Fine Arts
  - Office of Health, Physical Education and Safety
- Detroit Windsor Dance Academy
