= Truscon Laboratories =

Chemical research laboratory in Detroit, United States

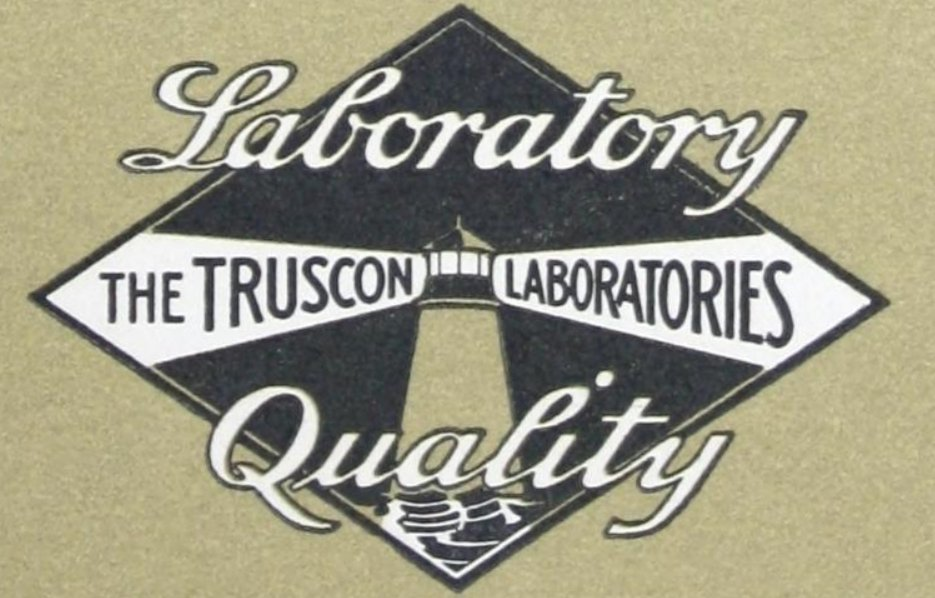
Truscon laboratories trademark

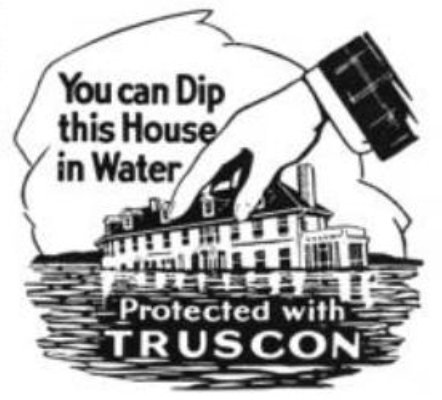
Truscon laboratories slogan

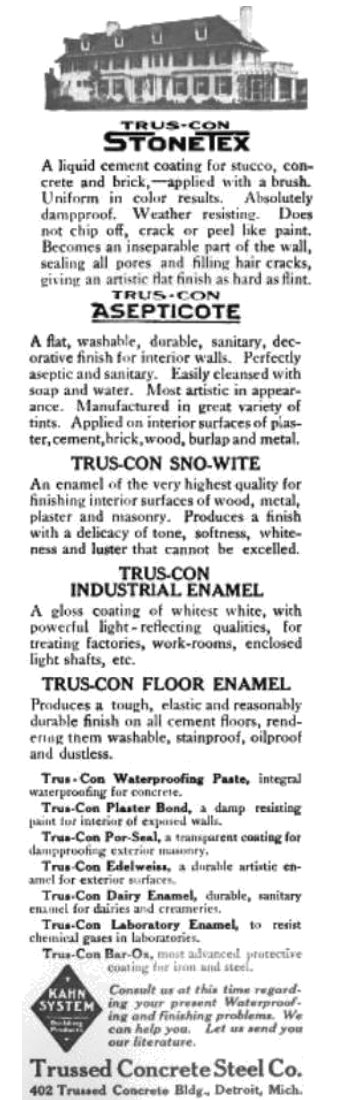
Scientific American advertisement 1911

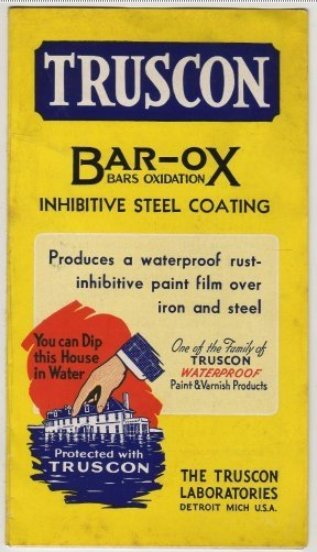
Truscon Bar-ox coating brochure

Truscon Laboratories was a research and development chemical laboratory of the Trussed Concrete Steel Company ("Truscon") of Detroit, Michigan. It made waterproofing liquid chemical products that went into or on cement and plaster. The products goals were to provide damp-proofing and waterproofing finishing for concrete and Truscon steel to guard against disintegrating action of water and air.

== Description of water resistant products ==
From Truscon laboratories viewpoint waterproofing was considered methods and means of protecting underground construction like foundations and footings. It also pertains to structures intended for retaining water like water tanks and containing water under hydrostatic conditions like in water pipes, tunnels, reservoirs, and cisterns. Damp-proofing was considered the methods of keeping dampness out of the main part of concrete buildings. It involves the methods of treating exposed walls above ground level to avoid the entrance of moisture into the building. These definitions then qualified their various products as servicing particular needs.

From the initial idea of protecting against water damage developed the science of integral waterproofing—the introduction of some element into the wet cement during the process of making causing a high degree of impermeability and imperviousness. Water in masonry does harm structurally because of its solvent properties and because it expands when frozen breaking concrete. Water is observed into concrete walls like a sponge absorbs water through capillary action. A wet wall produces damp and clammy conditions that promote and spread disease. While structural damp-proofing and waterproofing to prevent decay was a motive of the Truscon laboratories chemicals, the side benefit was that it provided better hygienic conditions.

Some of the products developed for damp-proofing was Por-Seal, Stone-Tex, Stone-Backing, and Plaster Bond. Water Proofing Paste, an ingredient used in the making of stucco cement and plaster, was developed for waterproofing. Another waterproofing product was named Water Proofed Cement Stucco.

== Surface protection products ==
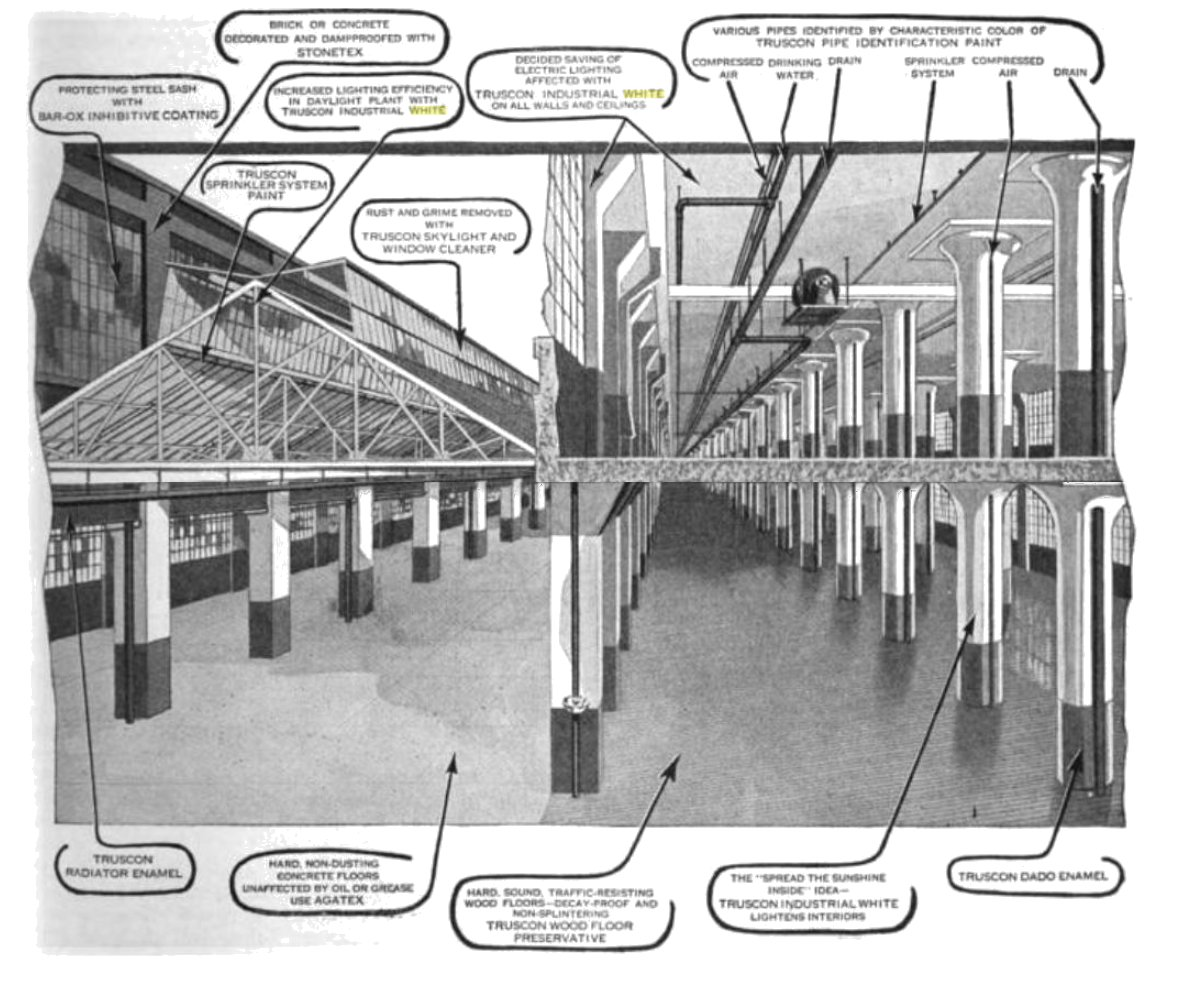
Truscon surface protection products and waterproofing usage

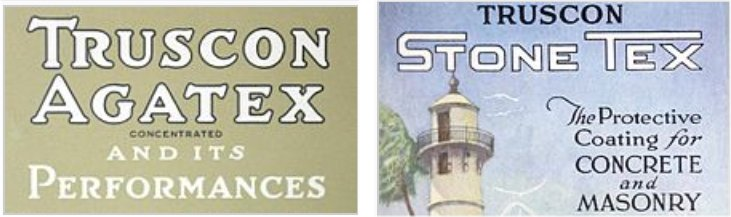
Truscon's Agate waterproofing product ----- and ----- Truscon's Stone Tex concrete finishing

Truscon laboratories waterproofing protection products were for residential housing, apartment buildings, office buildings, hotels, hospitals, and manufacturing plants. They involved enamels and interior finishes. The products were coatings to provide a dustless waterproof washable surface for cement floors and walls. The Truscon laboratories slogan was Waterproof is Weatherproof. Some of the brand names of these specialized products were Asepticote, Sno-Wite, Industrial Enamel, Hospital Enamel, Dairy Enamel, Floor Finish, Edelweiss and Alkali-Proof Wall Size. Its Asepticote waterproofing product was used in houses, hospitals, and hotels for its eye-soothing finish. Truscon's "Waterproofing Paste" was an integral part of cement and used in floors, plaster, and stucco to waterproof walls and floors. "Industrial White" was used in the interiors of mills and factories because of its white brightness qualities. Truscon's "Granatex Floor Varnish", a stain-resistant product, was a transparent waterproofing agent that was used on concrete and wood floors.

Truscon's Agatex was a chemical that hardened cement floors that was popular. It was a wet liquid that was applied on the surface of concrete like a paint or varnish. The product interacted with concrete and its dust chemically to resemble that of agate resulting in a hardened dustless surface when dry. The company claimed that the resultant treated surface was so hard that it would ring under a hammer like an anvil.

Truscon's "Stone-Tex" product was used on all kinds of masonry building exterior walls as a water-resistant protective coating. It was used on concrete blocks, cement walls, stucco and brick. It was also used for making the building more attractive looking.

Some of the thousands of Truscon laboratories product users were The Cincinnati Enquirer, American Tobacco Company, R. J. Reynolds Tobacco Company, Atlantic Petroleum, Haynes Automobile Company, Pennsylvania Railroad, E. W. Bliss Company, United States Military Academy, United States Marine Barracks, United States Shipping Board, Ferry-Morse Seed Company, Lowell Mills, Arlington Mills, H. J. Heinz Company, Dow Chemical laboratories, Winterhaven Citrus Growers' Association, Savage Arms, Curtiss Aeroplane and Motor Company, Liggett-Myers Tobacco Company and Sinclair Oil Corporation. St Johns County School District on Fullerwood Grade School building.

Buildings that used Truscon's products were the Packard automobile factory plant building number 10, Highland Park Ford Plant, Fisher Building, Fisher Body, Frederick Stearns Building, Youth's Companion Building, Midland Packing Building, Majestic Theater (Detroit, Michigan), Beech-Nut, Waco High School, Kalamazoo Paper, Detroit Crosstown Garage, Pennsylvania Rubber Company building, Minneapolis High School, Detroit Athletic Club, Detroit News building, and Milton Bradley building.

== Iron and steel protection products ==
Truscon laboratories iron and steel protection products were for priming structural steel like in structures iron industrial building frames, factories, bridges, viaducts, stacks, and boilers. They were also used with brewing coils, ice making coils, fireproofing, and acid-proofing. These paint on products were waterproofing and rust preventing agents. Many of these products went under the brand name of Bar-Ox and were given numbers that related to specific applications. Examples were Bar-Ox No. 7 for coating on exposed structural steel, Bar-Ox No. I4 for brine and condenser pipes, Bar-Ox 21 for stack enamel and boiler front enamel, Bar-Ox No. 28 for acid-proofing, Bar-Ox No. 35 for guarding against alkaline conditions, Bar-Ox No. 42 for conduit coating, and Bar-Ox No. 49 for gas holder tanks.

== Labor relations ==
The Detroit operation's employees were organized by District 50 of the United Mine Workers.

== See also ==
- Hy-Rib
- Julius Kahn
- Kahn System
- Albert Kahn Associates

== Bibliography ==
- Agatex (1917). Truscon agatex concentrated and its performances. Detroit, Michigan: Truscon Laboratories.
- Architectural, Building Press (1921). The American architect specification manual. Architectural and Building Press.
- BuildingAge (1926). Building Age and National Builder. Building Age Publishing Corporation.
- Chemical, Engineering Catalog (1922). Chemical Engineering Catalog Vol 7. Chemical Catalog Company.
- Chilton (1924). Iron Age. Chilton Company.
- Hughes, Agatha C.; Allen, Michael Thad; Hecht, Gabrielle (2001). Technologies of Power: Essays in Honor of Thomas Parke Hughes and Agatha Chipley Hughes. MIT Press. ISBN 978-0-262-51124-7.
- Manufacturers (1922). Manufacturers' Record.
- Michiganensian (1928). Michiganensian. UM Libraries. UOM:39015039396612.
- Murray, Gail Schmunk (1920). Architectural File. Truscon.
- Paint, American (1954). American Paint Journal. American Paint Journal Company.
- SpecificationManual (1921). The American architect specification manual. Architectural and Building Press.
- StoneTex, Truscon (1926). Truscon Stone Tex, a Protective Coating Made Especially for Damproofing and Beautifying Concrete, Stucco, Brick and Masonry Exterior Walls. Truscon laboratories.
- Sweet (1922). Sweet's Engineering Catalogue. Sweet's Catalogue Services.
- Sweet's (1915). Sweet's Engineering Catalogue: 1915. Sweet's Catalogue Services.
- T. S., Company (1919). Truson Copper Steel Buildings Standardized for the Oil Industry. ISBN 9785882004766.;
- TrussedConcrete, Steel Company (1910). Kahn System Standards: A Hand Book of Practical Calculations and Application of Reinforced Concrete.
- Truscon laboratories, Trussed Concrete Steel Company (1919). Structural Waterproofing: A Waterproofing Handbook and Reference Guide ... in the General Subjects of Waterproofing and Dampproofing.
- Truscon (1917). Hy-Rib Handbook; roofs—floors—walls—sidings—partitions—ceilings—furring—silos—tanks—conduits, concrete without forms. Youngstown, Ohio: Trussed Concrete Steel Company. OCLC 33111897.
- UM, Libraries (1929). Michigan Ensian. University of Michigan. UOM:39015039283711.
