= Sodium dithiophosphate =

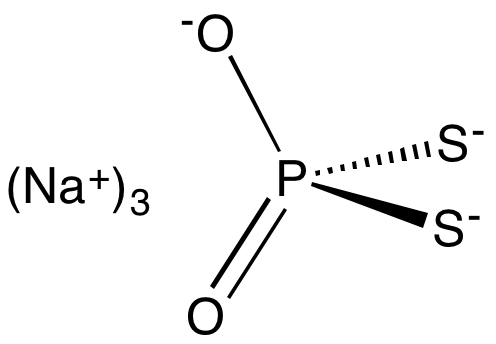

Identifiers
CAS Number	13721-37-4 anhydrous; 12175-62-1 undecahydrate
3D model (JSmol)	Interactive image; Interactive image
ChemSpider	32818081
PubChem CID	20430759; 118856075
- InChI: InChI=1S/3Na.H3O2PS2/c;;;1-3(2,4)5/h;;;(H3,1,2,4,5)/q3*+1;/p-3 Key: OFLNOEMLSXBOFY-UHFFFAOYSA-K; InChI=1S/3Na.H3O2PS2.H2O/c;;;1-3(2,4)5;/h;;;(H3,1,2,4,5);1H2/q3*+1;;/p-3 Key: ZBHVOFQECIYLFG-UHFFFAOYSA-K
- SMILES: [O-]P(=S)([O-])[S-].[Na+].[Na+].[Na+]; O.[O-]P(=S)([O-])[S-].[Na+].[Na+].[Na+]

Properties
Chemical formula	Na_{3}PS_{2}O_{2}
Molar mass	196.072 g mol^{−1}
- Except where otherwise noted, data are given for materials in their standard state (at 25 °C [77 °F], 100 kPa). verify (what is ?) Infobox references

Sodium dithiophosphate is the salt with the formula Na_{3}PS_{2}O_{2}. It is usually supplied as the hydrated solid or as an aqueous solution together with other thiophosphates such as sodium monothiophosphate and sodium trithiophosphate. Both Na_{3}PS_{2}O_{2} and its hydrate are colorless solids, but commercial samples can appear dark owing to the presence of impurities. It is used to facilitate the isolation of molybdenum from its ores.

== Preparation ==
The compound has been prepared in a multistep process starting with the base hydrolysis of phosphorus pentasulfide:

P_{2}S_{5} + 6 NaOH → 2 Na_{3}PO_{2}S_{2} + H_{2}S + 2 H_{2}O

The salt is isolated as the hydrate Na_{3}PO_{2}S_{2}^{.}(H_{2}O)_{11}. It is prone to hydrolysis, especially when it is heated as an aqueous solutions:

Na_{3}PO_{2}S_{2} + 2 H_{2}O → Na_{3}PO_{3}S + H_{2}S

The structure of the anhydrous compound has been examined by X-ray crystallography. The material consists of tetrahedral PO_{2}S_{2}^{3-} centers interconnected by Na^{+} ions. It is assumed that the hydrate retains the tetrahedral PO_{2}S_{2}^{3-} centers, but that the Na^{+} ions are bonded to water.

== Applications ==
The hydrated salt is used as a flotation agent in the purification of molybdenite (MoS_{2}) from other components of the ores. It is a major component of "Nokes reagent" (after Charles M. Nokes, who patented it in 1948). The salt is generated by the reaction of phosphorus pentasulfide with sodium hydroxide, often using impure reagents to obtain a mixture of the desired salt and related thiophosphates and oxidized species. Molybdenite particles, which are normally hydrophobic, become hydrophilic in the presence of this salt.

== Related dithiophosphates ==
Organic esters of dithiophosphate are sometimes also called dithiophosphates. Diethyl dithiophosphoric acid is the parent of one series of these organic compounds. These compounds are salts with the formula M^{+}(RO)_{2}PS^{−}_{2} (R = alkyl, usually). These lipophilic salts have also been used as a flotation "collectors" in the purification of various sulfide minerals. Zinc dithiophosphates also refers to this class of organic compounds.
