= C10H19O6PS2 =

The molecular formula C_{10}H_{19}O_{6}PS_{2} (molar mass: 330.36 g/mol, exact mass: 330.0361 u) may refer to:

- Isomalathion
- Malathion
