= Thiophosphate =

Class of chemical compounds

Thiophosphates (or phosphorothioates, PS) are chemical compounds and anions with the general chemical formula PS_{4−x}O^{3−}_{x} (x = 0, 1, 2, or 3) and related derivatives where organic groups are attached to one or more O or S. Thiophosphates feature tetrahedral phosphorus(V) centers.

== Organic derivatives ==
Organic thiophosphates include anions of the formula (RO)_{2}PS_{2}^{-} (where R = alkyl and aryl). They are conjugate bases of the acids (RO)_{2}PS_{2}H, which are derived by treating phosphorus pentasulfide with alcohols and phenols. These salts have lipophilic properties. They bind metal ions to give transition metal dithiophosphate complexes. They are structurally related to the inorganic thiophosphates. Common members have formulas of the type (RO)_{3−x}(RS)_{x}PS and related compounds where RO is replaced by RS. Many of these compounds are used as insecticides, some have medical applications, and some have been used as oil additives.

Selected organothiophosphates
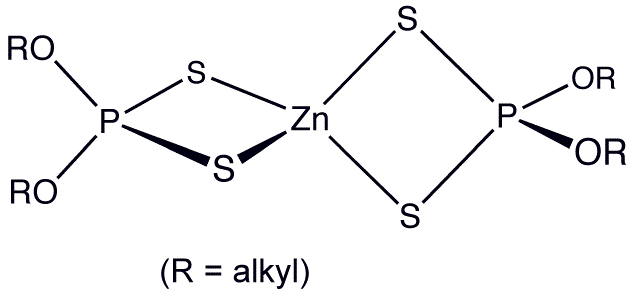
Zinc dialkyldithiophosphate, an oil additive.

Phosphorothioates are the basis for antisense therapies.

Amifostine, which is used in cancer chemotherapy.

Chlorpyrifos, a popular insecticide.

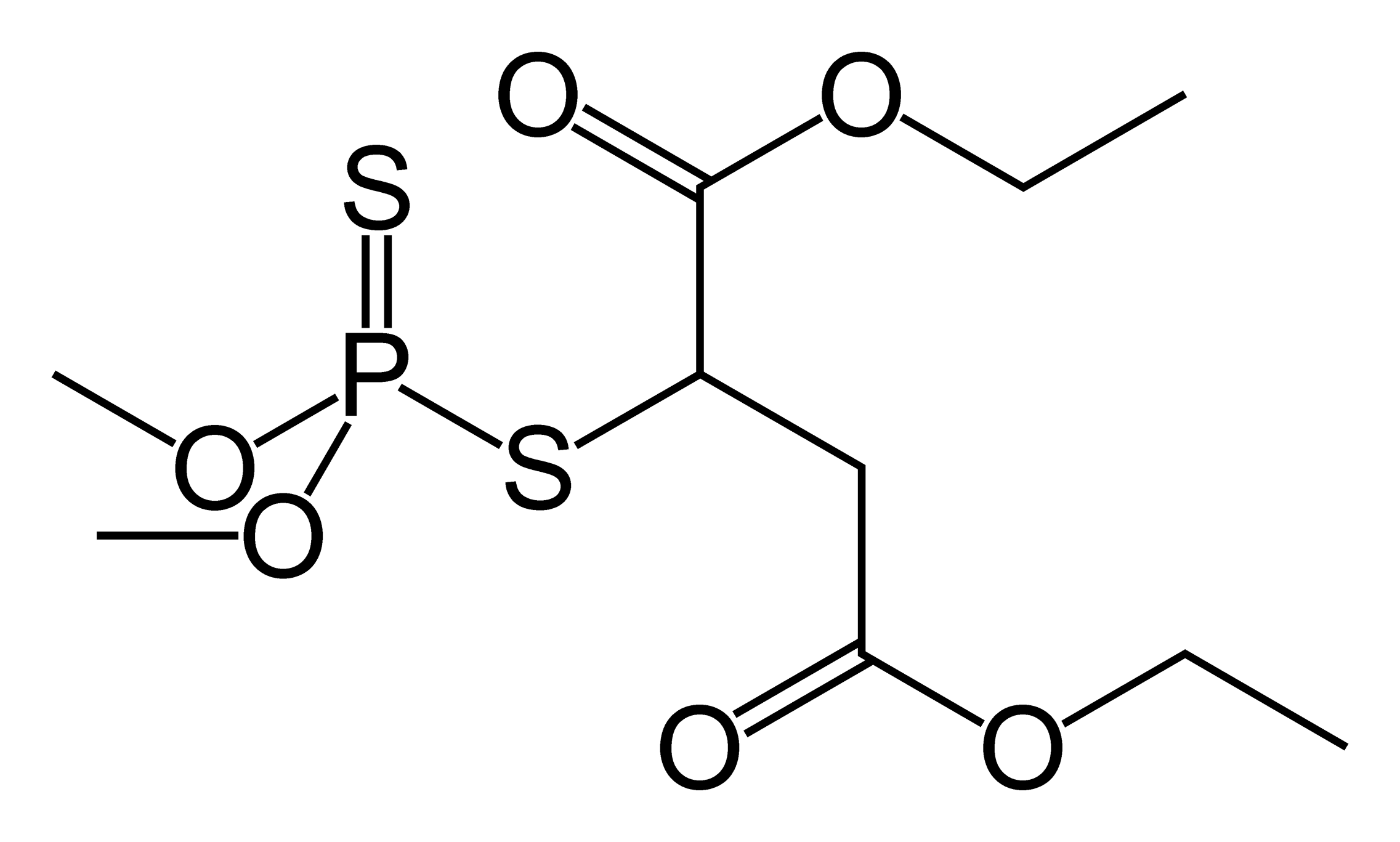
Malathion, a popular insecticide.

Oligonucleotide phosphorothioates (OPS) are modified oligonucleotides where one of the oxygen atoms in the phosphate moiety is replaced by sulfur. They are the basis of antisense therapy, e.g., the drugs fomivirsen (Vitravene), oblimersen, alicaforsen, and mipomersen (Kynamro). Phosphocysteamine, the thiophosphate H_{3}NCH_{2}CH_{2}SPO_{3}Na, is used as a drug equivalent to cysteamine for clearing excess cystine.

== Inorganic ==
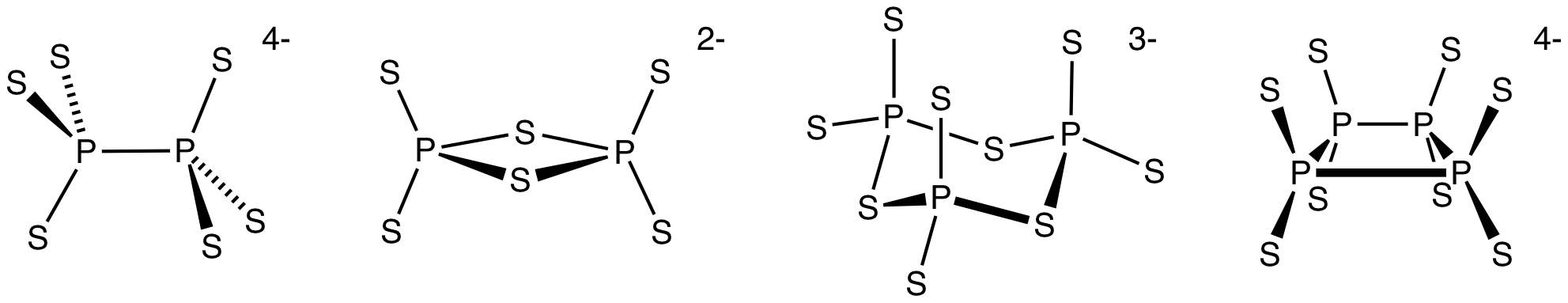
Structures of selected thiophosphates.

The simplest thiophosphates have the formula [PS_{4−x}O_{x}]^{3−}. These trianions are only observed at very high pH, instead they exist in protonated form with the formula [H_{n}PS_{4−x}O_{x}]^{(3−n)−} (x = 0, 1, 2, or 3 and (n = 1, 2, or 3).

=== Monothiophosphate ===
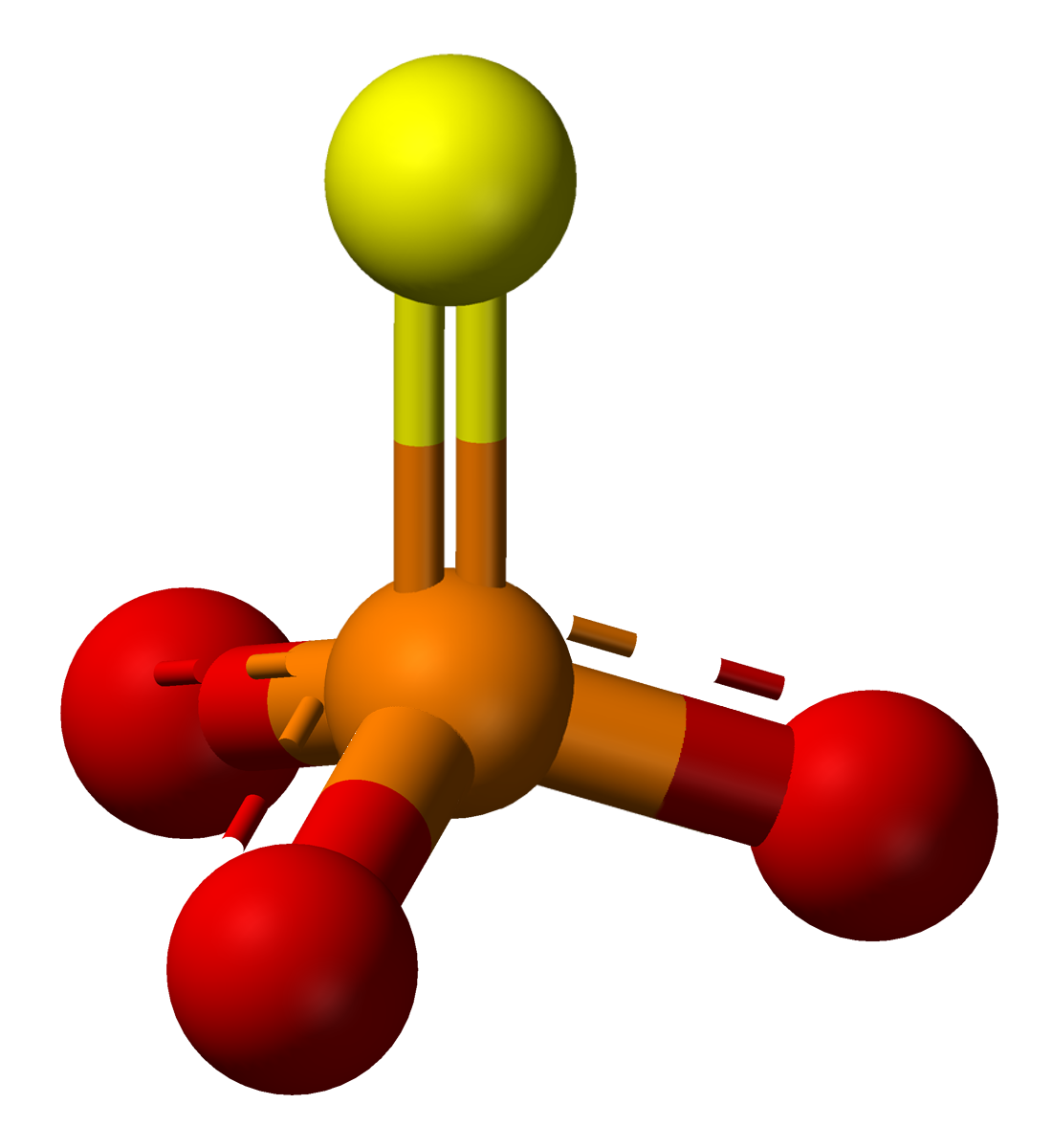
Ball-and-stick model of the hypothetical monothiophosphate trianion.

Monothiophosphate is the anion [PO_{3}S]^{3−}, which has C_{3v} symmetry. A common salt is sodium monothiophosphate (Na_{3}PO_{3}S). Monothiophosphate is used in research as an analogue of phosphate in biochemistry. Monothiophosphate esters are biochemical reagents used in the study of transcription, substitution interference assays. Sometimes, "monothiophosphate" refers to esters such as (CH_{3}O)_{2}POS^{−}.

=== Dithiophosphates ===
Dithiophosphate has the formula [PO_{2}S_{2}]^{3−}, which has C_{2v} symmetry. Sodium dithiophosphate, which is colorless, is the major product from the reaction of phosphorus pentasulfide with NaOH:

P_{2}S_{5} + 6 NaOH → 2 Na_{3}PO_{2}S_{2} + H_{2}S + 2 H_{2}O

Dithiophosphoric acid is obtained by treatment of barium dithiophosphate with sulfuric acid:

Ba_{3}(PO_{2}S_{2})_{2} + 3 H_{2}SO_{4} → 3 BaSO_{4} + 2 H_{3}PO_{2}S_{2}

Both Na_{3}PO_{2}S_{2} and especially H_{3}PO_{2}S_{2} are prone toward hydrolysis to their monothio derivatives.

=== Tri- and tetrathiophosphates ===
Trithiophosphate is the anion [POS_{3}]^{3−}, which has C_{3v} symmetry. Tetrathiophosphate is the anion [PS_{4}]^{3−}, which has T_{d} symmetry.

=== P_{x}S_{y}: binary thiophosphates and polyphosphates ===
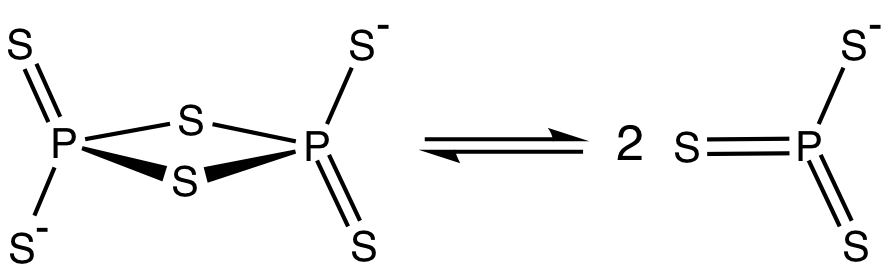
Dimerization equilibrium observed for PS_{3}^{−}.

A number of these anions known. Some have attracted interest as components in fast ion conductors for use in solid state batteries. The binary thiophosphates do not exhibit the extensive diversity of the analogous oxyanions but contain similar structural features, for example P is 4 coordinate, P−S−P links form and there are P−P bonds. One difference is that ions may include polysulfide fragments of 2 or more S atoms whereas in the P−O anions there is only the reactive −O−O−, peroxo, unit.

- PS^{−}_{3} is the analogue of the nitrate ion, NO^{−}_{3} (there is no PO^{−}_{3} analogue); it was isolated as the yellow tetraphenylarsonium salt
- PS^{3−}_{4} is the sulfur analogue of PO^{3−}_{4}, and like PO^{3−}_{4} is tetrahedral.
- P_{2}S^{4−}_{7} the pyrothiophosphate ion consisting of two corner sharing PS_{4} tetrahedra, analogous to the pyrophosphates.
- P_{2}S^{4−}_{10} An ion which can be visualised either as two PS_{4} tetrahedra joined by a disulfide link or a pyrothiophosphate where the bridging −S− is replaced by −S_{4}−.
- P_{2}S^{2−}_{6} edge-shared bitetrahedral structure. The structure is therefore similar to the isoelectronic Al_{2}Cl_{6} dimer. The oxygen analogue, dimetaphosphate P_{2}O^{2−}_{6}, in contrast, is not known, the metaphosphates favour polymeric structures of chains or rings.
- P_{2}S^{2−}_{8} and P_{2}S^{2−}_{10} are related to P_{2}S^{2−}_{6} but their two bridging −S− atoms are replaced by −S−S− in P_{2}S^{2−}_{8} and by an −S−S−S− bridge in P_{2}S^{2−}_{10}.
- P_{2}S^{4−}_{6} These form water-stable salts. The anion has an ethane-like structure and contains a P−P bond. The formal oxidation state of phosphorus is +4. The oxygen analogue is the hypodiphosphate anion, P_{2}O^{4−}_{6}.
- P_{3}S^{3−}_{9} contains a six-membered P_{3}S_{3} ring. The ammonium salt is produced by reaction of P_{4}S_{10} in liquid ammonia. Another way of visualising the structure is that it is the P_{4}S_{10} adamantane (P_{4}O_{10}) structure with a PS^{3+} vertex removed.
- P_{4}S^{4−}_{8} contains a square P_{4} ring, P_{5}S^{5−}_{10} contains a P_{5} ring and P_{6}S^{6−}_{12} a P_{6} ring. These (PS^{−}_{2})_{n} cyclic anions contain P with an oxidation state +3. Note they are not trigonal as arsenic(III) is in arsenites, but are tetrahedral with two bonds to other phosphorus atoms and two to sulfur. The P_{6}S^{6−}_{12} anion is analogous to the P_{6}O^{6−}_{12} ring anion.
- P_{4}S^{2−}_{2} An unusual butterfly-shaped ion, SP(P_{2})PS, which can be visualised as a P_{4} molecule where two P−S bonds replace one P−P bond.
- P_{7}S^{3−}_{3} is a sulfido heptaphosphane cluster anion.
