= Dimethyl dithiophosphoric acid =

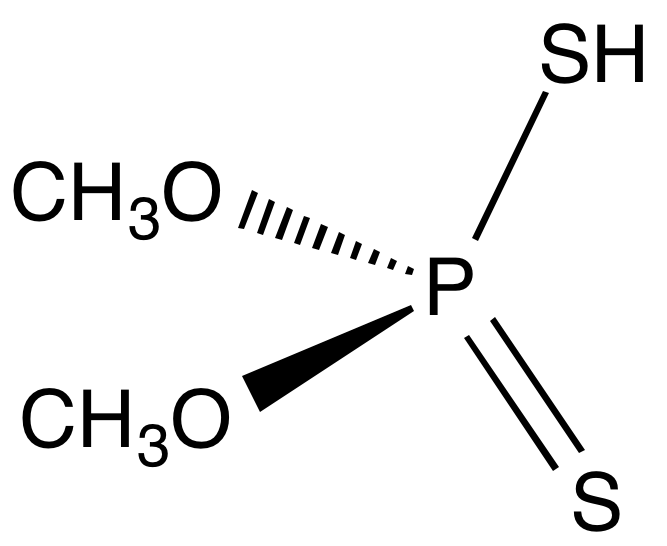

Names
- Preferred IUPAC name O,O-Dimethyl phosphorodithioate
- Other names O,O-Dimethyl dithiophosphoric acid; Dimethyl dithiophosphate; Dimethyl phosphorodithioate; Dimethyl ester of phosphorodithioic acid

Identifiers
CAS Number	756-80-9
3D model (JSmol)	Interactive image
ChEBI	CHEBI:166461
ChemSpider	12419
ECHA InfoCard	100.010.958
EC Number	212-053-9
PubChem CID	12959
UNII	4K09JRW4Z6
CompTox Dashboard (EPA)	DTXSID5027306
- InChI: InChI=1S/C2H7O2PS2/c1-3-5(6,7)4-2/h1-2H3,(H,6,7) Key: CZGGKXNYNPJFAX-UHFFFAOYSA-N; InChI=1/C2H7O2PS2/c1-3-5(6,7)4-2/h1-2H3,(H,6,7) Key: CZGGKXNYNPJFAX-UHFFFAOYAT
- SMILES: COP(=S)(OC)S

Properties
Chemical formula	C_{2}H_{7}O_{2}PS_{2}
Molar mass	158.17 g·mol^{−1}
Appearance	colorless liquid
Boiling point	62–64 °C (144–147 °F; 335–337 K) 0.5 mm Hg

Hazards
- GHS labelling
Pictograms	(GHS02: Flammable) (GHS05: Corrosive) (GHS07: Exclamation mark) (GHS08: Health hazard)
Signal word	Danger
Hazard statements	H226, H242, H290, H302, H314, H332, H361, H412
Precautionary statements	P201, P202, P210, P233, P234, P240, P241, P242, P243, P260, P264, P270, P271, P273, P280, P281, P301+P312, P301+P330+P331, P303+P361+P353, P304+P312, P304+P340, P305+P351+P338, P308+P313, P310, P312, P321, P330, P363, P370+P378, P390, P403+P235, P404, P405, P501
NFPA 704 (fire diamond)	3 2 1
- Except where otherwise noted, data are given for materials in their standard state (at 25 °C [77 °F], 100 kPa). Infobox references

Dimethyl dithiophosphoric acid is the organophosphorus compound with the formula (CH_{3}O)_{2}PS_{2}H. It is the processor for production of the organothiophosphate insecticide Malathion. Although samples can appear dark, the compound is a colorless, distillable liquid.

It is prepared by treating phosphorus pentasulfide with methanol:

P_{2}S_{5} + 4 CH_{3}OH → 2 (CH_{3}O)_{2}PS_{2}H + H_{2}S

== See also ==
- Ammonium diethyl dithiophosphate
- Diethyl dithiophosphoric acid
- Zinc dithiophosphate
