= Phosphorus trisulfide =

Phosphorus trisulfide may refer to:

- Phosphorus sesquisulfide
- Diphosphorus trisulfide
