= Ammonium diethyldithiophosphate =

Ammonium diethyl dithiophosphate

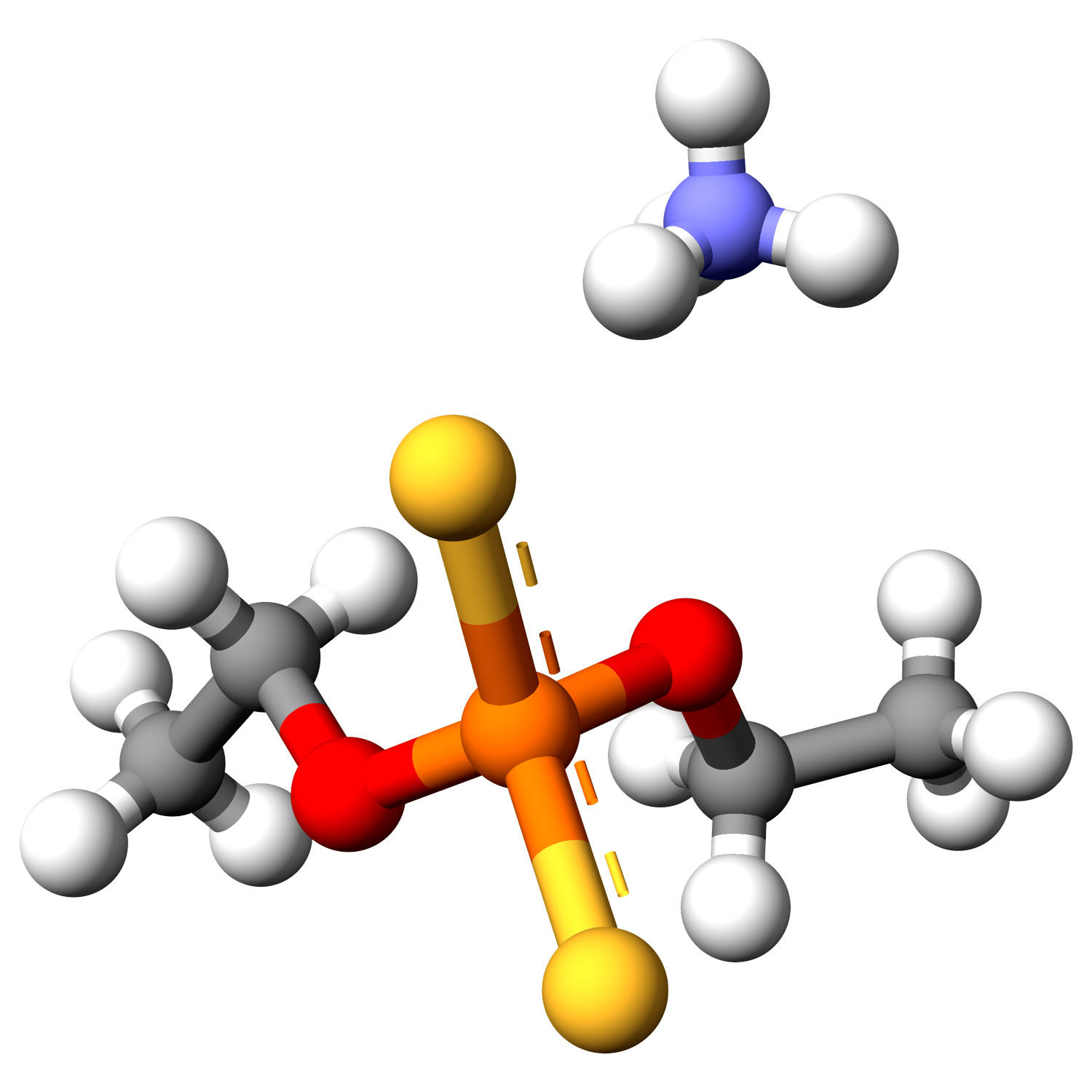

Names
- Preferred IUPAC name Azanium O,O′-diethyl phosphorodithioate
- Other names Ammonium O,O′-diethyldithiophosphate; Ammonium O,O-diethyl phosphorodithioate; Ammonium O,O-diethyl dithiophosphate; Ammonium O,O-diethyl diethiophosphate; Phosphorodithioic acid, O,O-diethyl ester, ammonium salt

Identifiers
CAS Number	1068-22-0
3D model (JSmol)	Interactive image
ChemSpider	13417
ECHA InfoCard	100.012.676
EC Number	213-942-4
PubChem CID	14036
UNII	NSX3KEL604
CompTox Dashboard (EPA)	DTXSID1058688
- InChI: InChI=1S/C4H11O2PS2.H3N/c1-3-5-7(8,9)6-4-2;/h3-4H2,1-2H3,(H,8,9);1H3 Key: HFRHTRKMBOQLLL-UHFFFAOYSA-N
- SMILES: [S-]P(=S)(OCC)OCC.[NH4+]

Properties
Chemical formula	C_{4}H_{14}NO_{2}PS_{2}
Molar mass	203.25 g·mol^{−1}
Appearance	White to yellowish crystals
Melting point	438 K (165 °C)

Hazards
- GHS labelling
Pictograms	(GHS07: Exclamation mark)
Signal word	Warning
Hazard statements	H302, H312, H332
Precautionary statements	P261, P264, P270, P271, P280, P301+P312, P302+P352, P304+P312, P304+P340, P312, P322, P330, P363, P501
NFPA 704 (fire diamond)	1 0 0
- Except where otherwise noted, data are given for materials in their standard state (at 25 °C [77 °F], 100 kPa). Infobox references

Ammonium diethyl dithiophosphate or more systematically ammonium O,O′-diethyl dithiophosphate, is the ammonium salt of diethyl dithiophosphoric acid. It is used as a source of the (C_{2}H_{5}O)_{2}PS_{2}^{−} ligand for preparing dithiophosphate complexes. Some such complexes have use as oil additives. It can be obtained by the reaction of phosphorus pentasulfide with ethanol and ammonia. In crystal structure of this compound the ammonium cation is connected by four charge-assisted N—H···S hydrogen bonds to four tetrahedral diethyl dithiophosphate anions.

== See also ==
- Dimethyl dithiophosphoric acid
- Zinc dithiophosphate
