= Thiophosphoric acid =

Names
- Other names Monothiophosphoric acid

Identifiers
CAS Number	13598-51-1
3D model (JSmol)	Interactive image
ChemSpider	146330
PubChem CID	167254
UNII	TYM4M7EWCW
CompTox Dashboard (EPA)	DTXSID8074948
- InChI: InChI=1S/H3O3PS/c1-4(2,3)5/h(H3,1,2,3,5) Key: RYYWUUFWQRZTIU-UHFFFAOYSA-N
- SMILES: OP(=S)(O)O

Properties
Chemical formula	H_{3}PO_{3}S
Molar mass	114.061
Appearance	colorless
Acidity (pK_{a})	1.79, 5.42, 10.08
- Except where otherwise noted, data are given for materials in their standard state (at 25 °C [77 °F], 100 kPa). Infobox references

Thiophosphoric acid is an inorganic compound with the chemical formula H_{3}PO_{3}S. Structurally, it is the acid derived from phosphoric acid with one oxygen atom replaced by sulfur atom, although it cannot be prepared from phosphoric acid. It is a colorless compound that is rarely isolated in pure form, but rather as a solution. The structure of the compound has not been reported, but two tautomers are reasonable: S=P(−OH)_{3} and O=P(−OH)_{2}(−SH).

== Preparation ==
The compound has been prepared in a multistep process starting with the base hydrolysis of phosphorus pentasulfide to give dithiophosphate, which is isolated as its barium salt:

P_{2}S_{5} + 6 NaOH → 2 Na_{3}PO_{2}S_{2} + H_{2}S + 2 H_{2}O
2 Na_{3}PO_{2}S_{2} + 3 BaCl_{2} → 2 Ba_{3}(PO_{2}S_{2})_{2} + 6 NaCl

In a second stage, the barium salt is decomposed with sulfuric acid, precipitating barium sulfate and liberating free dithiophosphoric acid:

Ba_{3}(PO_{2}S_{2})_{2} + 3 H_{2}SO_{4} → BaSO_{4} + 2 H_{3}PO_{2}S_{2}

Under controlled conditions, dithiophosphoric acid hydrolyses to give the monothioderivative:

H_{3}PO_{2}S_{2} + H_{2}O → H_{3}PO_{3}S + H_{2}S
