= Phosphorus selenide =

Group of chemical compounds

Phosphorus selenides are a relatively obscure group of compounds. There have been some studies of the phosphorus - selenium phase diagram and the glassy amorphous phases are reported. The compounds that have been reported are shown below. While some of phosphorus selenides are similar to their sulfide analogues, there are some new forms, molecular P_{2}Se_{5} and the polymeric catena-[P_{4}Se_{4}]_{x}. There is also some doubt about the existence of molecular P_{4}Se_{10}.

== Crystallographically confirmed compounds ==
=== P_{2}Se_{5} ===
Molecular P_{2}Se_{5} has a norbornane like structure with two phosphorus atoms with oxidation state +3 bridged by two diselenide units (−Se−Se−, analogous to disulfide) and one selenide unit (−Se−). It was isolated by solvent (CS_{2}) extraction from a P_{2}Se_{5} amorphous phase made from the elements.

=== P_{4}Se_{3} ===
P_{4}Se_{3} has been characterised crystallographically and has the same structure as the low temperature form of P_{4}S_{3}. It can be prepared from the elements. One preparation is to extract and recrystallise using tetralin.

=== P_{4}Se_{5} ===
The P_{4}Se_{5} molecule has the same structure as P_{4}S_{5}. It was prepared by reacting P_{4}Se_{3} with bromine in CS_{2}.

=== catena-[P_{4}Se_{4}]_{x} ===
This compound consists of polymeric chains of norbornane-like units joined by Se atoms. As each P atom in the repeat unit is bonded to another P atom and to two Se atoms, each P atom has a formal oxidation state of +2.

== Compounds confirmed spectroscopically ==
=== P_{4}Se_{4} ===
P_{4}Se_{4} has two crystalline forms α-P_{4}Se_{4} with the same molecular structure as α-P_{4}S_{4} and β-P_{4}Se_{4} with same molecular structure as β-P_{4}S_{4}. A fully characterised compound (CuI)_{3}P_{4}Se_{4} contains P_{4}Se_{4} with a β-P_{4}S_{4} structure.

=== P_{4}Se_{7} ===
This has been reported to have the same structure as P_{4}S_{7}. One well-known textbook does not mention it at all.

=== P_{4}Se_{10} ===
Molecular P_{4}Se_{10} has been reported to share the same structure as P_{4}S_{10} and P_{4}O_{10}, but one well-known textbook does not mention it at all. A review (2001) examining P-Se amorphous phases did not confirm the presence of molecular P_{4}Se_{10}. The isoelectronic anion [Ge_{4}Se_{10}]^{4−} which has the adamantane like P_{4}O_{10} structure is known, an example is the sodium salt Na_{4}[Ge_{4}Se_{10}].

== Other compounds ==
P_{4}Se_{6}, P_{14}Se, P_{4}Se, P_{4}Se_{2}, P_{2}Se, have been reported.

== Phosphorus - selenium glasses ==
Phosphorus - selenium glasses have been examined using ^{31}P-NMR and Raman spectroscopy. Glasses are formed in P_{x}Se_{1−x} over the range of compositions 0 < x < 0.8 with a small window around 0.52 – 0.60 centred on 0.57 (corresponding to the compound P_{4}Se_{3}) where there is a tendency to crystallise. For x < 0.47 the glasses contain Se_{n} chain fragments, pyramidal P units (P oxidation state +3), quasi-tetrahedral P units (P oxidation state +5, with P=Se double bond) and P_{2} units (P in formal oxidation state +4). There is no evidence for an amorphous phase containing molecular P_{4}Se_{10}.
