= Transition metal dithiophosphate complex =

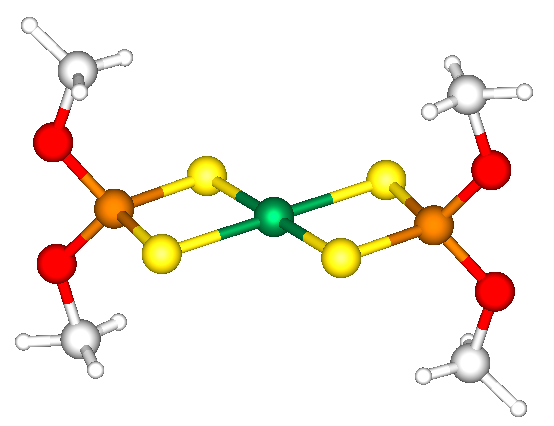
Structure of nickel bis(dimethyldithiophosphate). Color code: green = Ni, yellow = S, orange = P, red = O. Selected distance and angles: P-S =198, P-O = 156, Ni-S = 222 pm and S-P-S = 103°, S-Ni-S = 88°.

Transition metal dithiophosphate complexes are coordination compounds containing dithiophosphate ligands, i.e. ligands of the formula (RO)_{2}PS^{−}_{2}. The charge-neutral complexes tend to be soluble in organic solvents, especially when R is branched. Dithiophosphates are available with a wide variety of alkoxy groups. The range of complexes is similar to those for dithiocarbamate complexes.

== Preparation ==
Dithiophosphate ligands are prepared by alcoholysis of phosphorus pentasulfide:

P_{4}S_{10} + 8 C_{2}H_{5}OH → 4 (C_{2}H_{5}O)_{2}PS_{2}H + 2 H_{2}S

Dialkoxydithiophoric acids react with many metal oxides, chlorides, and acetates:

3 (C_{2}H_{5}O)_{2}PS_{2}H + CrCl_{3}(H_{2}O)_{6} → Cr[S_{2}P(OC_{2}H_{5})_{2}]_{3} + 3 HCl + 6 H_{2}O

Alternatively, salts, such as ammonium diethyldithiophosphate, can be used to prepare complexes by salt metathesis reactions:

2 NH_{4}[S_{2}P(OC_{2}H_{5})_{2}] + NiCl_{2}·(H_{2}O)_{6} → Ni(S_{2}P(OC_{2}H_{5})_{2}) + 6 H_{2}O + 2 NH_{4}Cl
3 NH_{4}[S_{2}P(OCH_{3})_{2}] + MoCl_{3}(thf)_{3} → Mo[S_{2}P(OCH_{3})_{2}]_{3} + 3 NH_{4}Cl + 3 thf (thf = tetrahydrofuran)

Oxidation of dithiophosphoric acid gives the disulfide. Dithiophosphate complexes have also been prepared by oxidative addition of these disulfides:

[S_{2}P(OC_{2}H_{5})_{2}]_{2} + Ni(P(OC_{6}H_{5})_{3})_{4} → Ni(S_{2}P(OC_{2}H_{5})_{2})_{2} + 4 P(OC_{6}H_{5})_{3}

== Ligand properties ==
Dithiophosphates, when bidentate, are classified as L-X ligands in the Covalent bond classification method. In the usual electron counting method, they are three-electron ligands. With respect to HSAB theory, dithiophosphates are classified as soft ligands. In addition to the conventional representation, they are also described by a zwitterionic resonance structure (RO)_{2}P^{+}(S^{−})_{2}. Phosphorus is tetrahedral.

== Selected homoleptic complexes ==
Structure of a ligand (L) adduct of a typical zinc bis(dithiophosphate) complex. Such zinc dithiophosphate complexes are usually pentacoordinate.

Homoleptic complexes have formulas M[S_{2}P(OR)_{2}]_{4}, M[S_{2}P(OR)_{2}]_{3}, and M[S_{2}P(OR)_{2}]_{2}.

- Zr[S_{2}P(OC_{3}H_{7})_{2}]_{4}
- V[S_{2}P(OC_{2}H_{5})_{2}]_{3}, red-brown,
- Cr[S_{2}P(OC_{2}H_{5})_{2}]_{3}, violet
- Mo[S_{2}P(OCH_{3})_{2}]_{3}, red
- Fe[S_{2}P(OC_{3}H_{7})_{2}]_{3}
- Ru[S_{2}P(OC_{2}H_{5})_{2}]_{3} pink, paramagnetic
- Ir[S_{2}P(OC_{3}H_{7})_{2}]_{3}
- Ni[S_{2}P(OC_{6}H_{11})_{2}]_{2} violet
- Pd[S_{2}P(OC_{2}H_{5})_{2}]_{2}
- Pt[S_{2}P(OC_{2}H_{5})_{2}]_{2} yellow, diamagnetic
- Cu[S_{2}P(OC_{6}H_{4}CH_{3})_{2}]_{2}
- poly-Zn[S_{2}P(OC_{2}H_{5})_{2}]_{2}

These complexes are almost always solids at room temperature.

== Applications ==
Zinc dialkyldithiophosphates are components of oil additives. Dithiophosphate complexes are also implicated as intermediates in froth flotation, e.g. for the purification of copper from slag.
