= Sodium monothiophosphate =

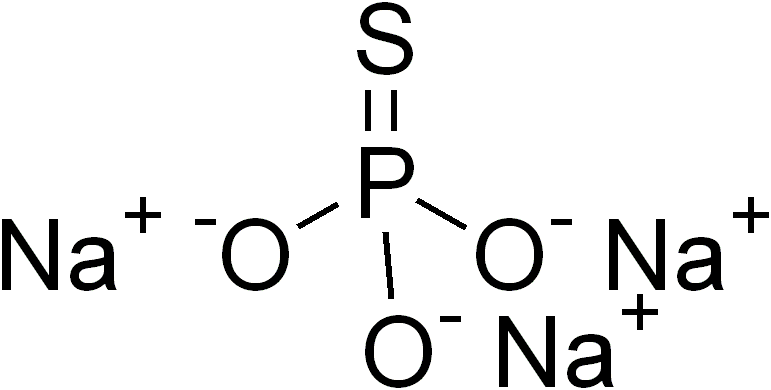
- Molecular model of sodium monothiophosphate

Names
- IUPAC name Sodium monothiophosphate

Identifiers
| CAS Number | 10101-88-9 (anhydrous); (nonahydrate): 51674-18-1; (dodecahydrate): 51674-17-0 |
| 3D model (JSmol) | Interactive image; (nonahydrate): Interactive image; (dodecahydrate): Interactive image |
| ChemSpider | 8053214; (dodecahydrate): 23499061 |
| ECHA InfoCard | 100.030.224 |
| EC Number | 233-261-6 |
| PubChem CID | 6913045; (nonahydrate): 165360175; (dodecahydrate): 45052183 |
| UNII | AN1017219I; (dodecahydrate): 4VBT402QNM |
| CompTox Dashboard (EPA) | DTXSID30889527; (nonahydrate): DTXSID401336664; (dodecahydrate): DTXSID501336667 |
- InChI: InChI=1S/3Na.H3O3PS/c;;;1-4(2,3)5/h;;;(H3,1,2,3,5) Key: RZLYVIFNQHQSQM-UHFFFAOYSA-N; (nonahydrate): InChI=1S/3Na.H3O3PS.9H2O/c;;;1-4(2,3)5;;;;;;;;;/h;;;(H3,1,2,3,5);9*1H2/q3*+1;;;;;;;;;;/p-3 Key: KGZBZRPZTFGJAF-UHFFFAOYSA-K; (dodecahydrate): InChI=1S/3Na.H3O3PS.12H2O/c;;;1-4(2,3)5;;;;;;;;;;;;/h;;;(H3,1,2,3,5);12*1H2/q3*+1;;;;;;;;;;;;;/p-3 Key: AALQBIFJJJPDHJ-UHFFFAOYSA-K
- SMILES: [O-]P(=S)([O-])[O-].[Na+].[Na+].[Na+]; (nonahydrate): O.O.O.O.O.O.O.O.O.[O-]P(=S)([O-])[O-].[Na+].[Na+].[Na+]; (dodecahydrate): O.O.O.O.O.O.O.O.O.O.O.O.[O-]P(=S)([O-])[O-].[Na+].[Na+].[Na+]

Properties
| Chemical formula | Na_{3}PO_{3}S |
| Molar mass | 180.00 g·mol^{−1} |
| Appearance | White solid |
| Density | 1.58 g/cm^{3} (dodecahydrate); 2.40 g/cm^{3} (anhydrous) |
| Melting point | 120 to 125 °C (248 to 257 °F; 393 to 398 K) (decomposition) |
| Solubility in water | soluble |
- Except where otherwise noted, data are given for materials in their standard state (at 25 °C [77 °F], 100 kPa). verify (what is ?) Infobox references

Sodium monothiophosphate, or sodium phosphorothioate, is an inorganic compound with the chemical formula Na_{3}PO_{3}S. It is a sodium salt of monothiophosphoric acid (H_{3}PO_{3}S). Sodium monothiophosphate forms hydrates Na_{3}PO_{3}S·xH_{2}O. The anhydrous form and all hydrates are white solids. The anhydrous salt (x = 0) (Na_{3}PO_{3}S) decomposes without melting at 120-125 °C. More common is the dodecahydrate (Na_{3}PO_{3}S·12H_{2}O). A nonahydrate is also known (Na_{3}PO_{3}S·9H_{2}O).

Related salts are the sodium dithiophosphate undecahydrate Na_{3}PO_{2}S_{2}·11H_{2}O, sodium trithiophosphate undecahydrate Na_{3}POS_{3}·11H_{2}O, and sodium tetrathiophosphate octahydrate Na_{3}PS_{4}·8H_{2}O.

== Preparation ==
Sodium monothiophosphate is prepared by the base hydrolysis of thiophosphoryl chloride using aqueous sodium hydroxide:

PSCl_{3} + 6 NaOH + 9 H_{2}O → Na_{3}PO_{3}S·12H_{2}O + 3 NaCl

This reaction affords the dodecahydrate, which is easily dehydrated.

Partial dehydration over 6.5 M H_{2}SO_{4} gives the nonahydrate. Under flowing N_{2}, the anhydrous salt is formed.

Sodium monothiophosphate decomposes at neutral pH. Silicone grease catalyses the hydrolysis of the monothiophosphate ion PO_{3}S^{3−}, so it is recommended that it is not used in the glass joints.

In the anhydrous salt, the P-S bond is 211 pm and the three equivalent P-O bonds are short at 151 pm. These disparate values suggest that the P-S bond is single.
