= Phosphorus sesquisulfide =

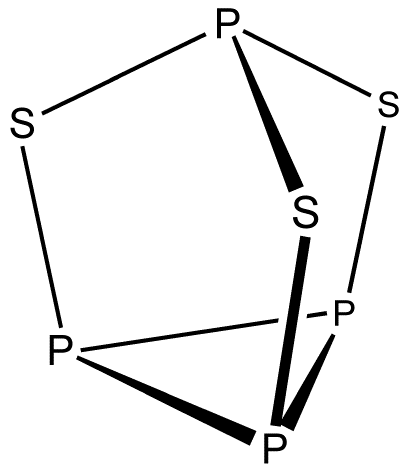

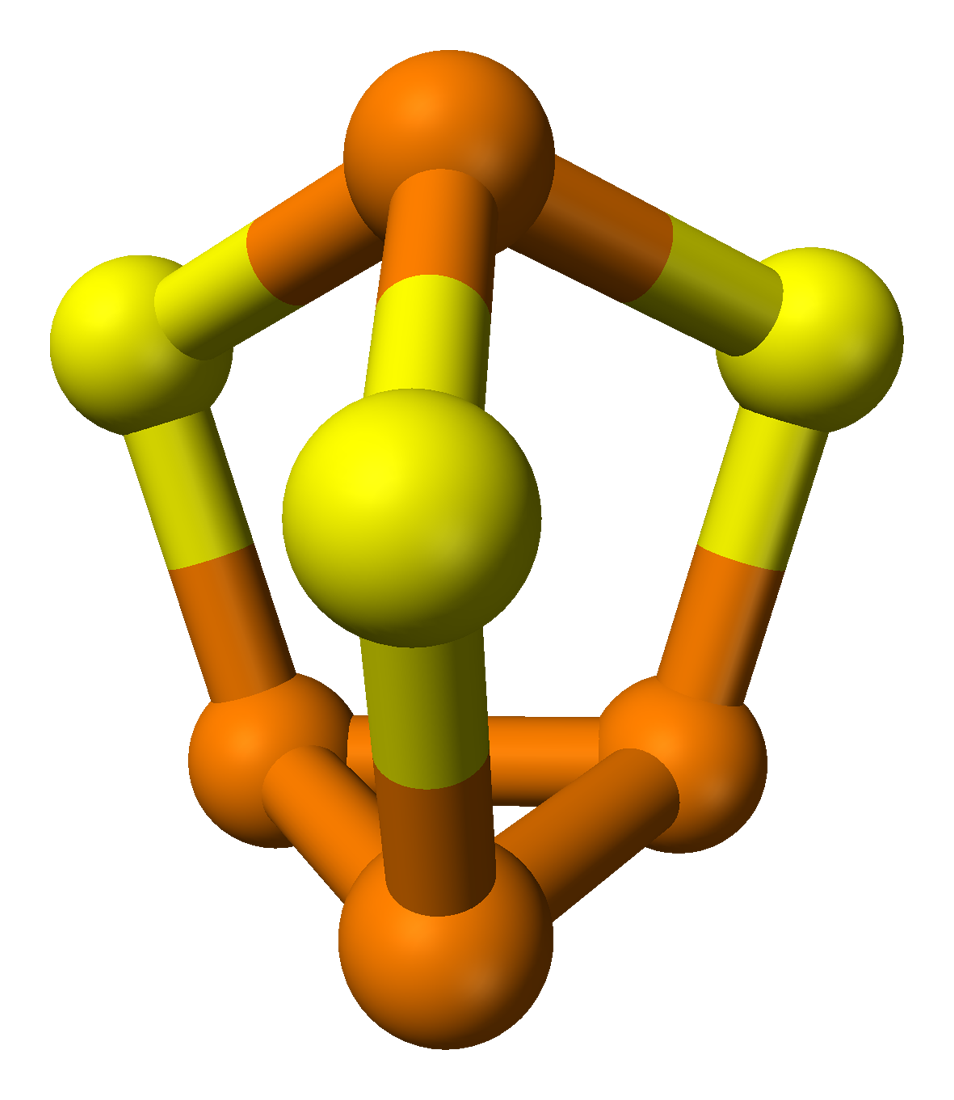

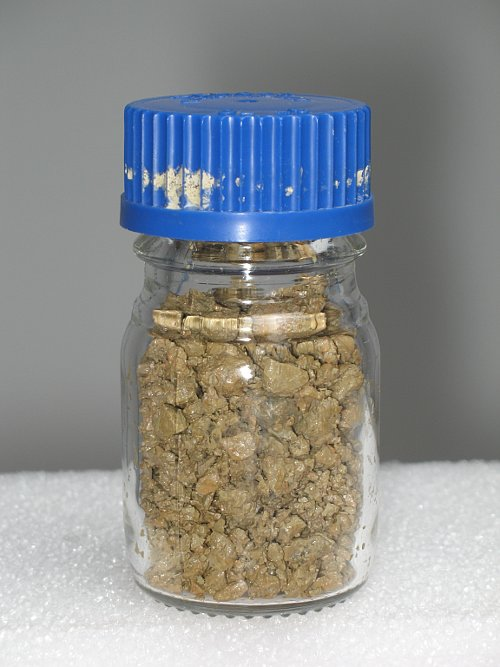

Names
- IUPAC names Tetraphosphorus trisulfide or 3,5,7-trithia-1,2,4,6-tetraphosphatricyclo[2.2.1.0^{2,6}]heptane
- Other names phosphorus trisulfide, phosphorus sesquisulfide, phosphorus sulfide

Identifiers
CAS Number	1314-85-8
3D model (JSmol)	Interactive image
ChemSpider	14134
ECHA InfoCard	100.013.860
PubChem CID	14818
RTECS number	TH4330000
UNII	8V5Q0M194Y
CompTox Dashboard (EPA)	DTXSID4074562
- InChI: InChI=1S/P4S3/c5-1-2-3(1)7-4(5)6-2 Key: RWQFRHVDPXXRQN-UHFFFAOYSA-N; InChI=1/P4S3/c5-1-2-3(1)7-4(5)6-2 Key: RWQFRHVDPXXRQN-UHFFFAOYAM
- SMILES: S1P2P3SP1SP23

Properties
Chemical formula	P_{4}S_{3}
Molar mass	220.093 g/mol
Appearance	Yellow, yellow-green or gray solid
Density	2.08 g.cm^{3}, solid
Melting point	172.5 °C (342.5 °F; 445.6 K)
Boiling point	408 °C (766 °F; 681 K)

Structure
Crystal structure	orthorhombic, Schönflies notation D_{2h}
Space group	Pmnb
Point group	C_{3v}

Related compounds
Related compounds	Phosphorus sulfides; P_{4}Se_{3}; As_{4}S_{3}

Hazards
- Occupational safety and health (OHS/OSH)
Main hazards	Irritant
- GHS labelling
Pictograms	(GHS07: Exclamation mark)
- Except where otherwise noted, data are given for materials in their standard state (at 25 °C [77 °F], 100 kPa). verify (what is ?) Infobox references

Phosphorus sesquisulfide is the inorganic compound with the formula P_{4}S_{3}. It was developed by Henri Sevene and Emile David Cahen in 1898 as part of their invention of friction matches that did not pose the health hazards of white phosphorus. This yellow solid is one of two commercially produced phosphorus sulfides. It is a component of "strike anywhere" matches.

Depending on purity, samples can appear yellow-green to grey. The compound was discovered by G. Lemoine and first produced safely in commercial quantities in 1898 by Albright and Wilson. It dissolves in an equal weight of carbon disulfide (CS_{2}), and in a 1:50 weight ratio of benzene. Unlike some other phosphorus sulfides, P_{4}S_{3} is slow to hydrolyze and has a well-defined melting point.

== Structure and synthesis ==
The molecule has C_{3v} symmetry. It is a derivative of the tetrahedral (P_{4}) unit from insertion of sulfur into three P-P bonds. The P-S and P-P distances are 2.090 and 2.235 Å, respectively. P_{4}Se_{3} and P_{4}S_{3} adopt the same structures. These compounds can be melted together and form mixed crystals of one dissolved in the other. Under higher temperatures, mixed chalcogenide molecules P_{4}S_{2}Se and P_{4}SSe_{2} will form.

P_{4}S_{3} is produced by the reaction of red or white phosphorus with sulfur. Excess sulfur gives phosphorus pentasulfide (P_{4}S_{10}). It is estimated that 150 ton/y were produced in 1989.

== Applications ==
P_{4}S_{3} and potassium chlorate, together with other materials, composes the heads of "strike-anywhere matches".

== Safety ==
Its flash point is about 100 °C.

== Health effects ==
Exposure to "strike anywhere" matches containing phosphorus sesquisulfide can cause contact dermatitis, usually in the pocket area but also on the face. Exposure over a long period of time to burning match tips (containing phosphorus sesquisulfide) can result in a recurring severe primary dermatitis about the eyes and face. Loosening of the teeth has also been reported which may have been due to phosphorus poisoning.
