= Malaoxon =

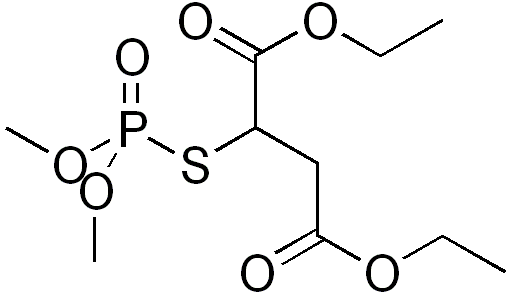

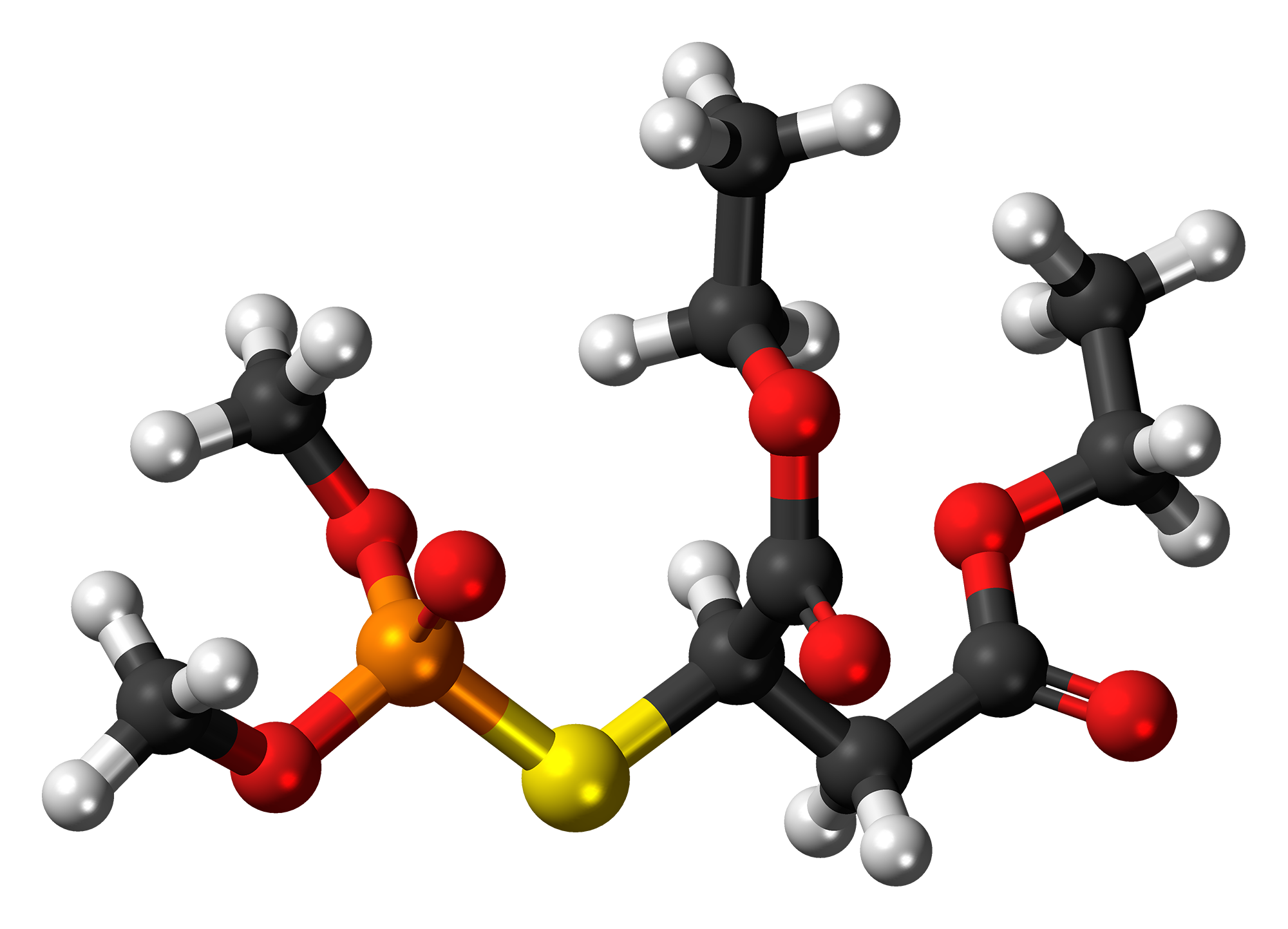

Names
- IUPAC name diethyl 2-(dimethoxyphosphorylsulfanyl)butanedioate
- Other names 2-(dimethoxyphosphorylthio) butanedioic acid diethyl ester

Identifiers
CAS Number	1634-78-2
3D model (JSmol)	Interactive image
ChemSpider	14674
ECHA InfoCard	100.162.859
EC Number	204-497-7
KEGG	C07498
PubChem CID	15415
UNII	2439JYF84Q
CompTox Dashboard (EPA)	DTXSID9020790
- InChI: InChI=1S/C10H19O7PS/c1-5-16-9(11)7-8(10(12)17-6-2)19-18(13,14-3)15-4/h8H,5-7H2,1-4H3 Key: WSORODGWGUUOBO-UHFFFAOYSA-N; InChI=1/C10H19O7PS/c1-5-16-9(11)7-8(10(12)17-6-2)19-18(13,14-3)15-4/h8H,5-7H2,1-4H3 Key: WSORODGWGUUOBO-UHFFFAOYAC
- SMILES: CCOC(=O)CC(C(=O)OCC)SP(=O)(OC)OC

Properties
Chemical formula	C_{10}H_{19}O_{7}PS
Molar mass	314.292421
- Except where otherwise noted, data are given for materials in their standard state (at 25 °C [77 °F], 100 kPa). verify (what is ?) Infobox references

Malaoxon (Liromat, Malation oxon, Malthon oxon) is a chemical compound with the formula C_{10}H_{19}O_{7}PS. More specifically, it is a phosphorothioate. It is a breakdown product of, and more toxic than, malathion.

== Air and water ==
This chemical may be sensitive to prolonged exposure to air. Slightly water-soluble.

== Fire hazard ==
This chemical is combustible.

== Health hazard ==
Symptoms of exposure to this type of compound include cholinesterase inhibition, miosis, frontal headache, increased bronchial secretion, nausea, vomiting, sweating, abdominal cramps, diarrhea, lacrimation, increased salivation, bradycardia, cyanosis and muscular twitching of the eyelids, tongue, face and neck, possibly progressing to convulsions. Other symptoms include hyperemia of the conjunctiva, dimness of vision, rhinorrhea, bronchoconstriction, cough, fasciculation, anorexia, incontinence, eye changes, weakness, dyspnea, bronchospasm, hypotension or hypertension due to asphyxia, restlessness, anxiety, dizziness, drowsiness, tremor, ataxia, depression, confusion, neuropathy (rare), coma and death from depression of respiratory or cardiovascular systems. Exposure to this type of compound may result in giddiness, nervousness, blurred vision, discomfort (tightness) in chest, papilledema, muscular weakness, loss of reflexes, loss of sphincter control, cardiac arrhythmias, various degrees of heart block and cardiac arrest. It may also result in spasm of accommodation, aching pain in and about the eye, nystagmus, delayed distal axonopathy and paresthesias and paralysis of limbs. A decrease in blood pressure may occur. Respiratory failure may also occur.

== Acute/chronic hazards ==
This compound is toxic by ingestion. It is a cholinesterase inhibitor. When heated to decomposition, it emits toxic fumes of sulfur oxides and phosphorus oxides.

== Reactivity profile ==
A thioorganophosphate, ester. Organophosphates are susceptible to formation of highly toxic and flammable phosphine gas in the presence of strong reducing agents such as hydrides. Partial oxidation by oxidizing agents may result in the release of toxic phosphorus oxides. Esters react with acids to liberate heat along with alcohols and acids. Strong oxidizing acids may cause a vigorous reaction that is sufficiently exothermic to ignite the reaction products. Heat is also generated by the interaction of esters with caustic solutions. Flammable hydrogen is generated by mixing esters with alkali metals and hydrides.
