= Isomalathion =

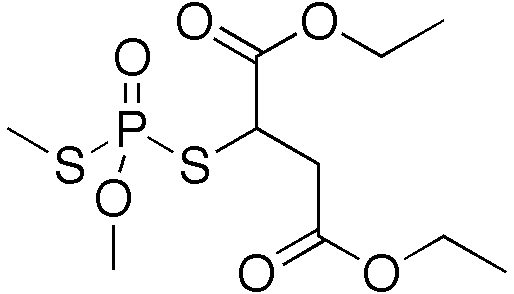

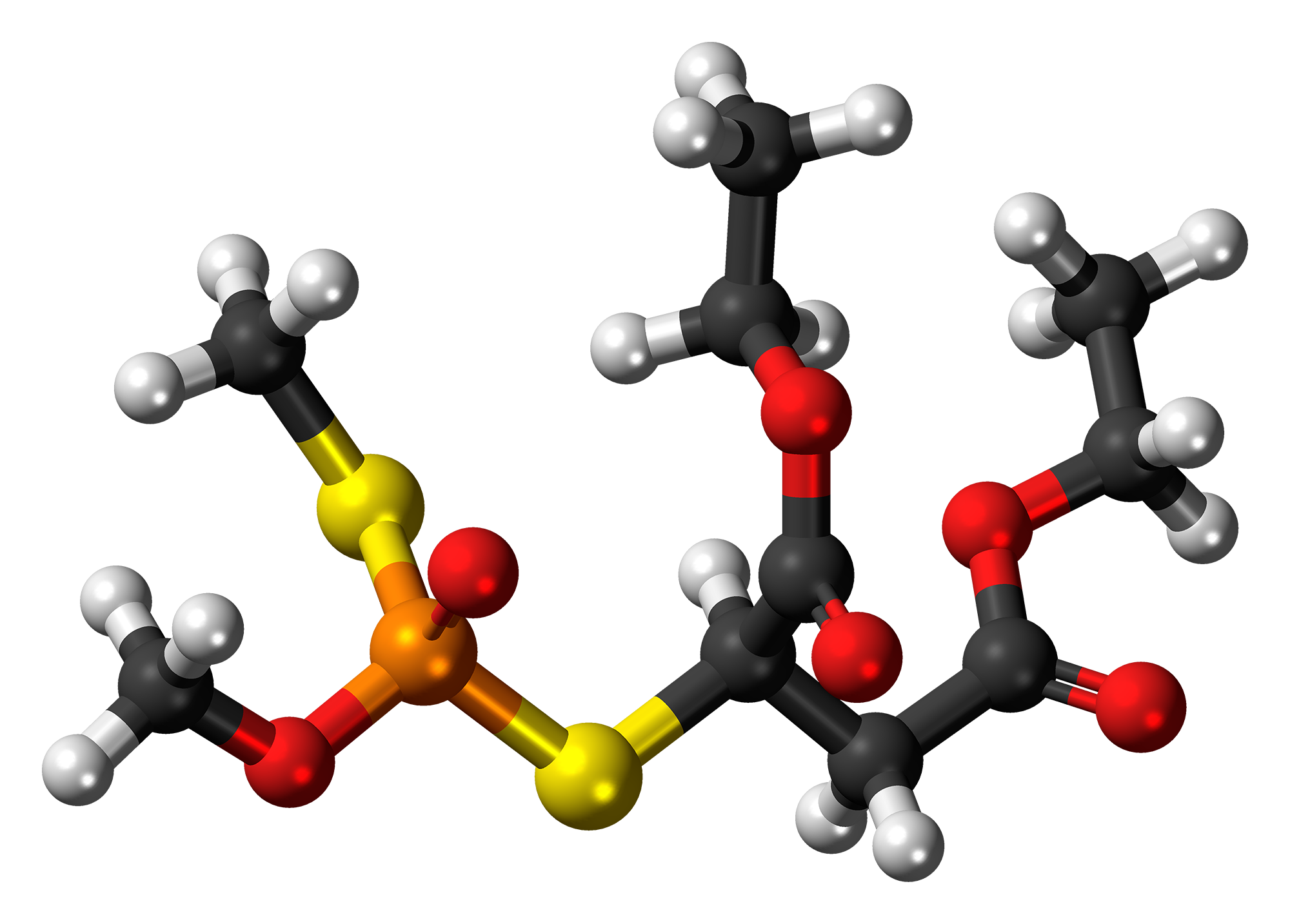

Names
- Preferred IUPAC name Diethyl {[methoxy(methylsulfanyl)phosphoryl]sulfanyl}butanedioate
- Other names S-Methylmalathion

Identifiers
CAS Number	3344-12-5
3D model (JSmol)	Interactive image
ChemSpider	82649
PubChem CID	91529
UNII	9XEP5P83AO
CompTox Dashboard (EPA)	DTXSID9058363
- InChI: InChI=1S/C10H19O6PS2/c1-5-15-9(11)7-8(10(12)16-6-2)19-17(13,14-3)18-4/h8H,5-7H2,1-4H3 Key: LPQDGVLVYVULMX-UHFFFAOYSA-N; InChI=1/C10H19O6PS2/c1-5-15-9(11)7-8(10(12)16-6-2)19-17(13,14-3)18-4/h8H,5-7H2,1-4H3 Key: LPQDGVLVYVULMX-UHFFFAOYAO
- SMILES: CCOC(=O)CC(C(=O)OCC)SP(=O)(OC)SC

Properties
Chemical formula	C_{10}H_{19}O_{6}PS_{2}
Molar mass	330.36 g/mol
- Except where otherwise noted, data are given for materials in their standard state (at 25 °C [77 °F], 100 kPa). verify (what is ?) Infobox references

Isomalathion is an impurity and a toxic degradation product found in some batches of malathion. It arises from the thermal or photochemical isomerization of malathion. Whereas the structure of malation is, generically, RSP(S)(OCH_{3})_{2}, the connectivity of isomalathion is RSPO(SCH_{3})(OCH_{3}). It also has four stereoisomers due to two chiral centers, containing asymmetric phosphorus and carbon atoms placed at positions 1 and 3. Being significantly more toxic to humans than malathion, it has resulted in human poisonings.

== History/Discovery ==
Isomalathion's presence and recognition as a toxic compound, especially in commercial formulations, was revealed in 1976, during Pakistan's malaria epidemic. Out of the 7500 field workers assigned to contain malaria during Pakistan's malaria control program, 2800 spraymen suffered from malathion poisoning, including 5 deaths. The spraymen who exhibited the greatest levels of toxicity were contained the highest levels of isomalathion, highlighting its significance as a toxic compound.

== Properties ==
Isomalathion's toxicity lies in its ability to act as an inhibitor of carboxyesterase and acetylcholinesterase (AChE). The stereoisomers denoted and ordered in potency of inhibiting AChE are (1R,3R) > (1R,3S) > (1S,3R) > (1S,3S). Isomalathion is considered to be an organophosphorous compound (OP) which, like malathion, is commonly found in insecticides, pesticides and chemical warfare agents. Compounds like isomalathion get their toxicity by the inhibition of enzymes such as AChE, like previously mentioned, and butyrylcholinesterase (BChE). This mechanism of inhibition is primarily through the OP phosphorylating the Ser active site of the enzyme, leading to the formation of a stable conjugate.
