= Diethyl dithiophosphoric acid =

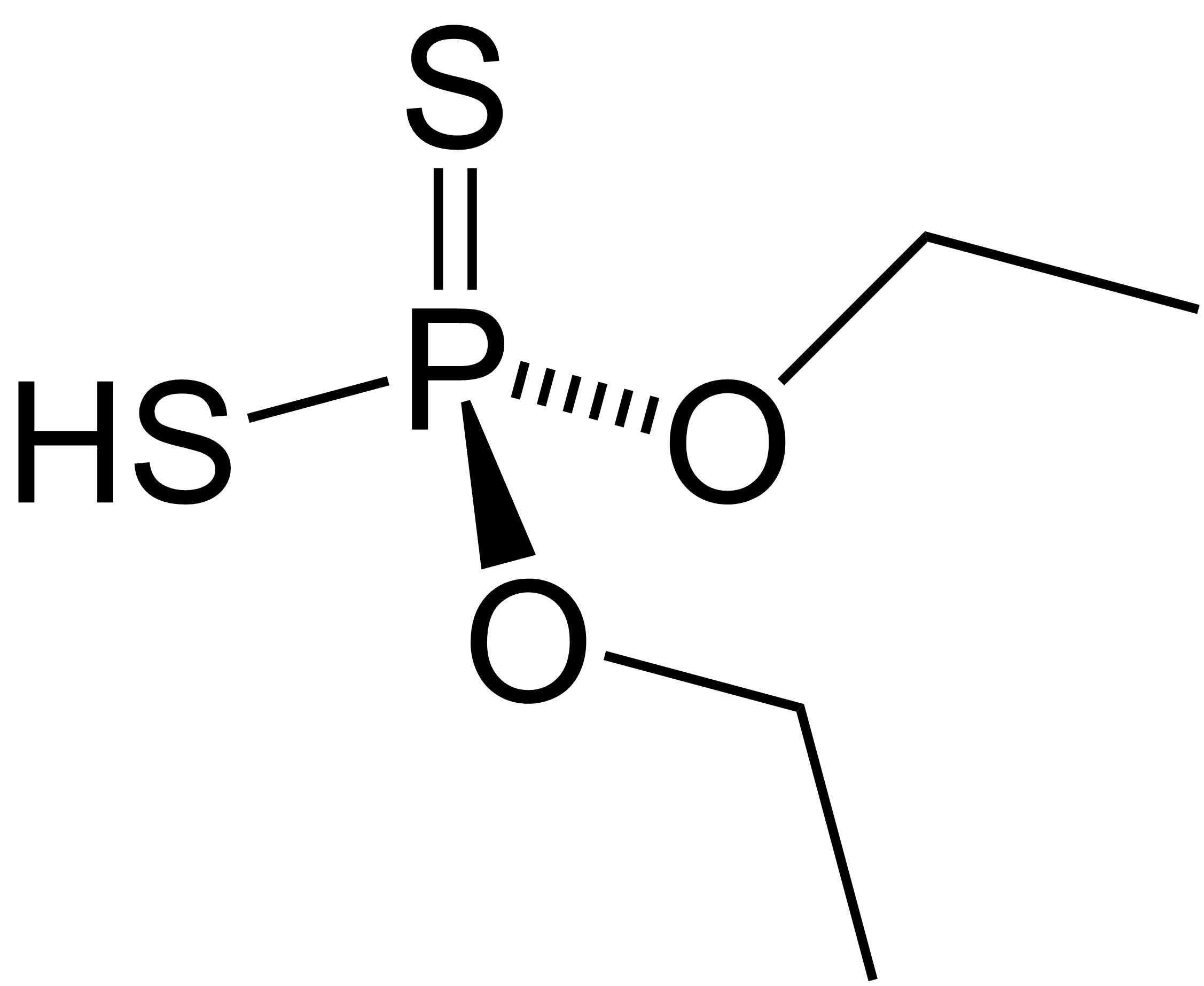

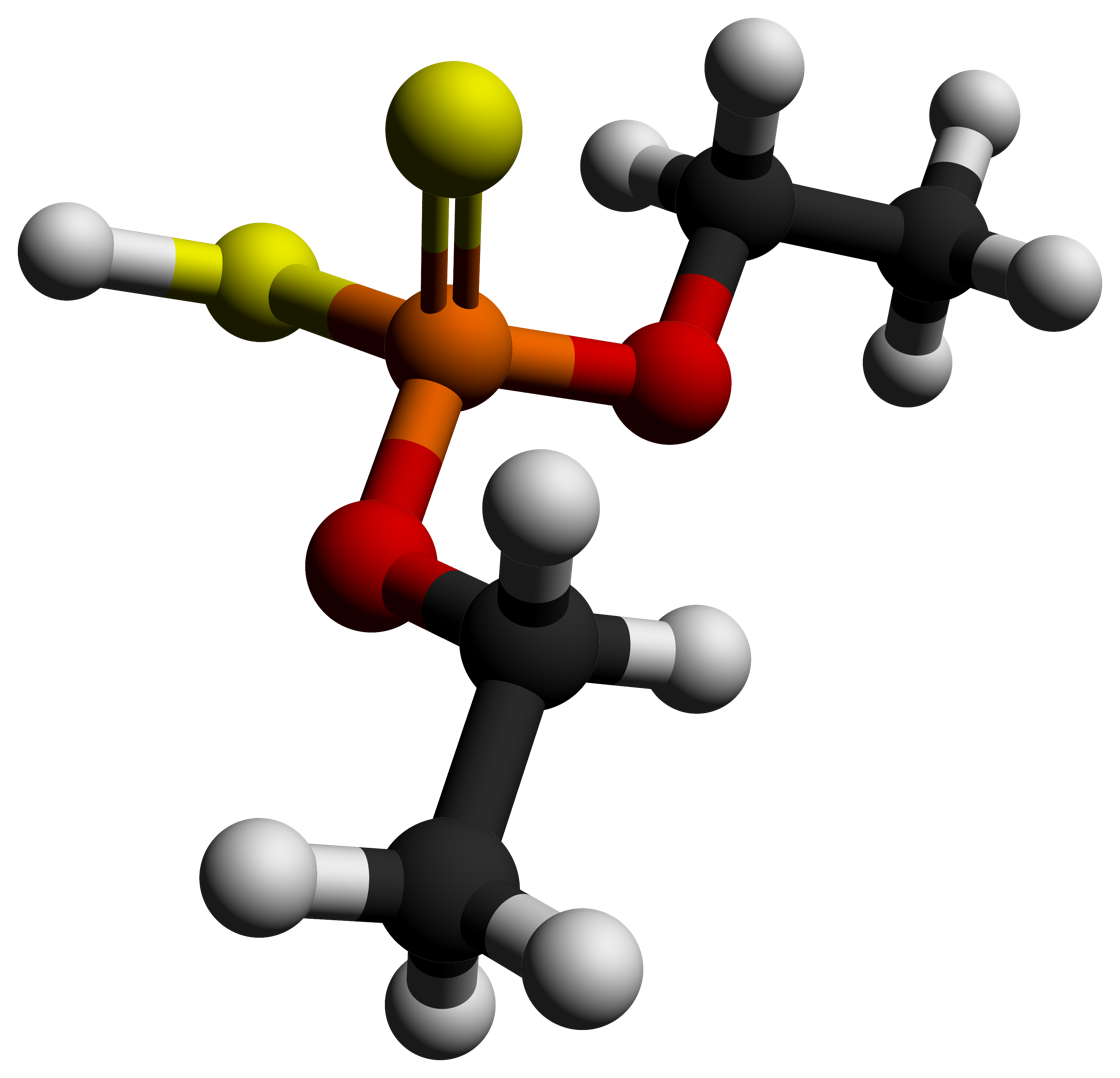

Names
- Preferred IUPAC name O,O-Diethyl hydrogen phosphorodithioate
- Other names O,O-Diethyl dithiophosphoric acid; Diethyl dithiophosphate; Diethyl phosphorodithioate; Diethyl ester of phosphorodithioic acid

Identifiers
CAS Number	298-06-6
3D model (JSmol)	Interactive image
ChEMBL	ChEMBL1886492
ChemSpider	8917
ECHA InfoCard	100.005.506
EC Number	206-055-9
PubChem CID	9274
RTECS number	TD7350000
UNII	02C5XR639P
CompTox Dashboard (EPA)	DTXSID6027133
- InChI: InChI=1S/C4H11O2PS2/c1-3-5-7(8,9)6-4-2/h3-4H2,1-2H3,(H,8,9) Key: IRDLUHRVLVEUHA-UHFFFAOYSA-N; InChI=1/C4H11O2PS2/c1-3-5-7(8,9)6-4-2/h3-4H2,1-2H3,(H,8,9) Key: IRDLUHRVLVEUHA-UHFFFAOYAW
- SMILES: CCOP(=S)(OCC)S

Properties
Chemical formula	C_{4}H_{11}O_{2}PS_{2}
Molar mass	186.22 g·mol^{−1}
Appearance	colorless liquid
Melting point	< 0 °C (32 °F; 273 K)
Boiling point	66 °C (151 °F; 339 K) at 1 mmHg

Hazards
- GHS labelling
Pictograms	(GHS05: Corrosive) (GHS06: Toxic)
Signal word	Danger
Hazard statements	H301, H311, H314, H330
Precautionary statements	P260, P264, P270, P271, P280, P284, P301+P310, P301+P330+P331, P302+P352, P303+P361+P353, P304+P340, P305+P351+P338, P310, P312, P320, P321, P330, P361, P363, P403+P233, P405, P501
NFPA 704 (fire diamond)	3 2 1
Flash point	82 °C (180 °F; 355 K)
Autoignition temperature	538 °C (1,000 °F; 811 K)
- Lethal dose or concentration (LD, LC)
LD_{50} (median dose)	500 mg/kg (rabbit, dermal); 4510 mg/kg (rat, oral)
- Except where otherwise noted, data are given for materials in their standard state (at 25 °C [77 °F], 100 kPa). Infobox references

Diethyl dithiophosphoric acid, sometimes mistakenly called diethyl dithiophosphate, is the organophosphorus compound with the formula (C_{2}H_{5}O)_{2}PS_{2}H. It is the processor for production of the organophosphate insecticide Terbufos. Although samples can appear dark, it is a colorless liquid.

It is prepared by treating phosphorus pentasulfide with ethanol:

P_{2}S_{5} + 4 C_{2}H_{5}OH → 2 (C_{2}H_{5}O)_{2}PS_{2}H + H_{2}S

== Reactions ==
Structure of a typical zinc bis(dithiophosphate) complex (L = ligand).

Diethyl- and dimethyl dithiophosphoric acids react with bases. The results of this neutralization reaction are salts, e.g., ammonium diethyl dithiophosphate.

Diethyl dithiophosphoric acid reacts with zinc oxide to give zinc dithiophosphate, which is used as an oil additive:

ZnO + 2 (C_{2}H_{5}O)_{2}PS_{2}H → [(C_{2}H_{5}O)_{2}PS_{2}]_{2}Zn + H_{2}O

Oxidation of dialkoxydithiophosphoric acids with iodine gives the disulfides:

2 (RO)_{2}PS_{2}H + I_{2} → (RO)_{2}P(S)S−SP(S)(OR)_{2} + 2 HI

== See also ==
- Dimethyl dithiophosphoric acid
