= Phosphorus sulfides =

Class of chemical compounds

Phosphorus sulfides comprise a family of inorganic compounds containing only phosphorus and sulfur. These compounds have the formula P_{4}S_{n} with n ≤ 10. Two are of commercial significance, phosphorus pentasulfide (P_{4}S_{10}), which is made on a kiloton scale for the production of other organosulfur compounds, and phosphorus sesquisulfide (P_{4}S_{3}), used in the production of "strike anywhere matches".

There are several other phosphorus sulfides in addition to P_{4}S_{3} and P_{4}S_{10}. Six of these phosphorus sulfides exist as isomers: P_{4}S_{4}, P_{4}S_{5}, P_{4}S_{6}, P_{4}S_{7}, P_{4}S_{8}, and P_{4}S_{9}. These isomers are distinguished by Greek letter prefixes. The prefix is based on the order of the discovery of the isomers, not their structure. All known molecular phosphorus sulfides contain a tetrahedral array of four phosphorus atoms. P_{4}S_{2} is also known but is unstable above −30 °C.

Phosphorus monosulfide monomer, PS, is highly unstable and only exists at elevated temperatures. Its bond, worth about 55 kcal/mol, is about 2.4 angstroms long.

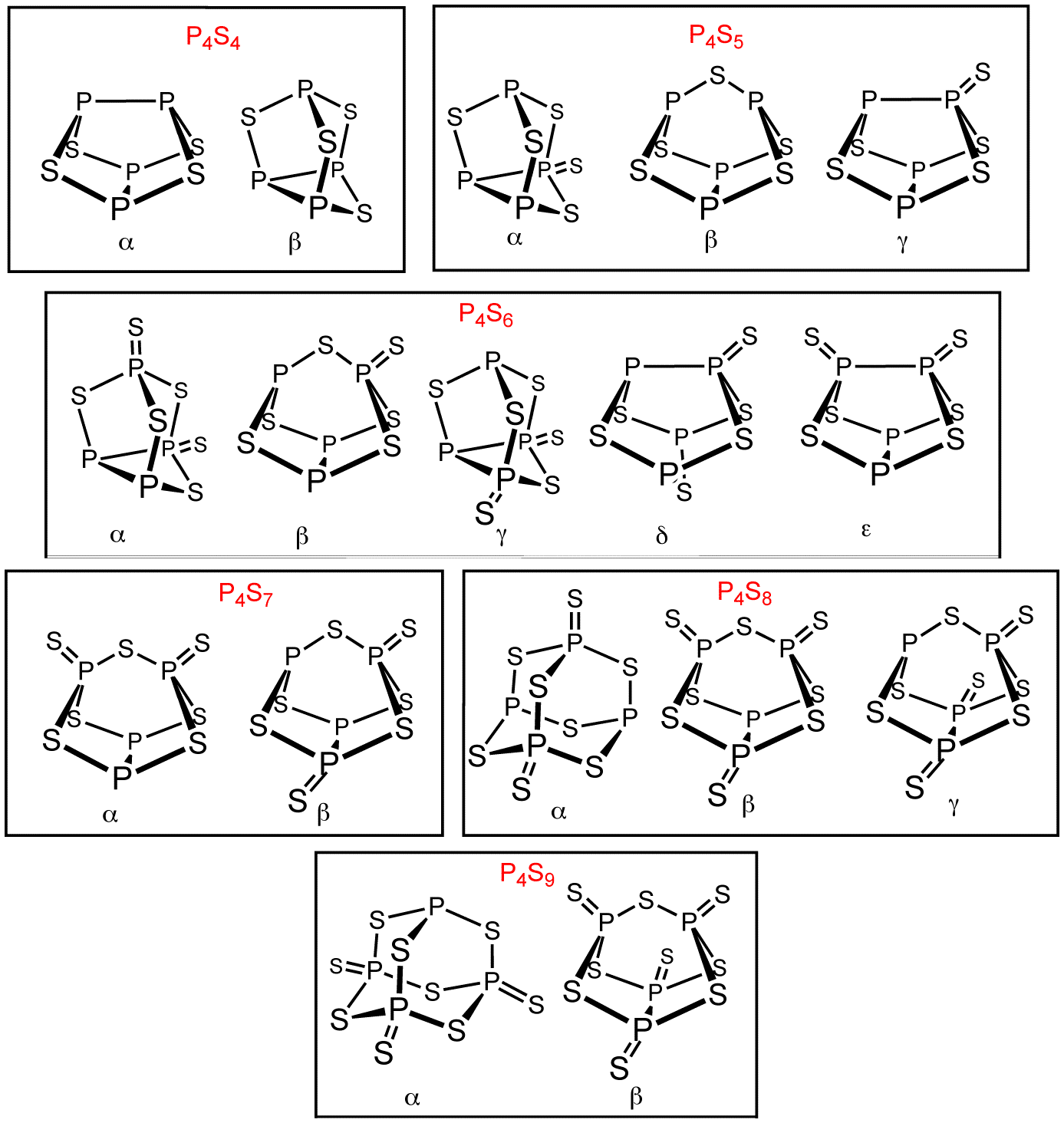
Phosphorus sulfides that exist in isomeric forms

== Preparation ==
The main method for preparing these compounds is thermolysis of mixtures of phosphorus and sulfur. The product distributions can be analyzed by ^{31}P-NMR spectroscopy. More selective syntheses entail:

- desulfurization, e.g. using triphenylphosphine and, complementarily,
- sulfidation using triphenylarsine sulfide.

=== P_{4}S_{3} ===
Phosphorus sesquisulfide is prepared by treating red phosphorus with sulfur above 450 K, followed by careful recrystallization with carbon disulfide and benzene. An alternative method involves the controlled fusion of white phosphorus with sulfur in an inert, non-flammable solvent.

=== P_{4}S_{4} ===
The α- and β- forms of P_{4}S_{4} can be prepared by treating the corresponding isomers of P_{4}S_{3}I_{2} with ((CH_{3})_{3}Sn)_{2}S:

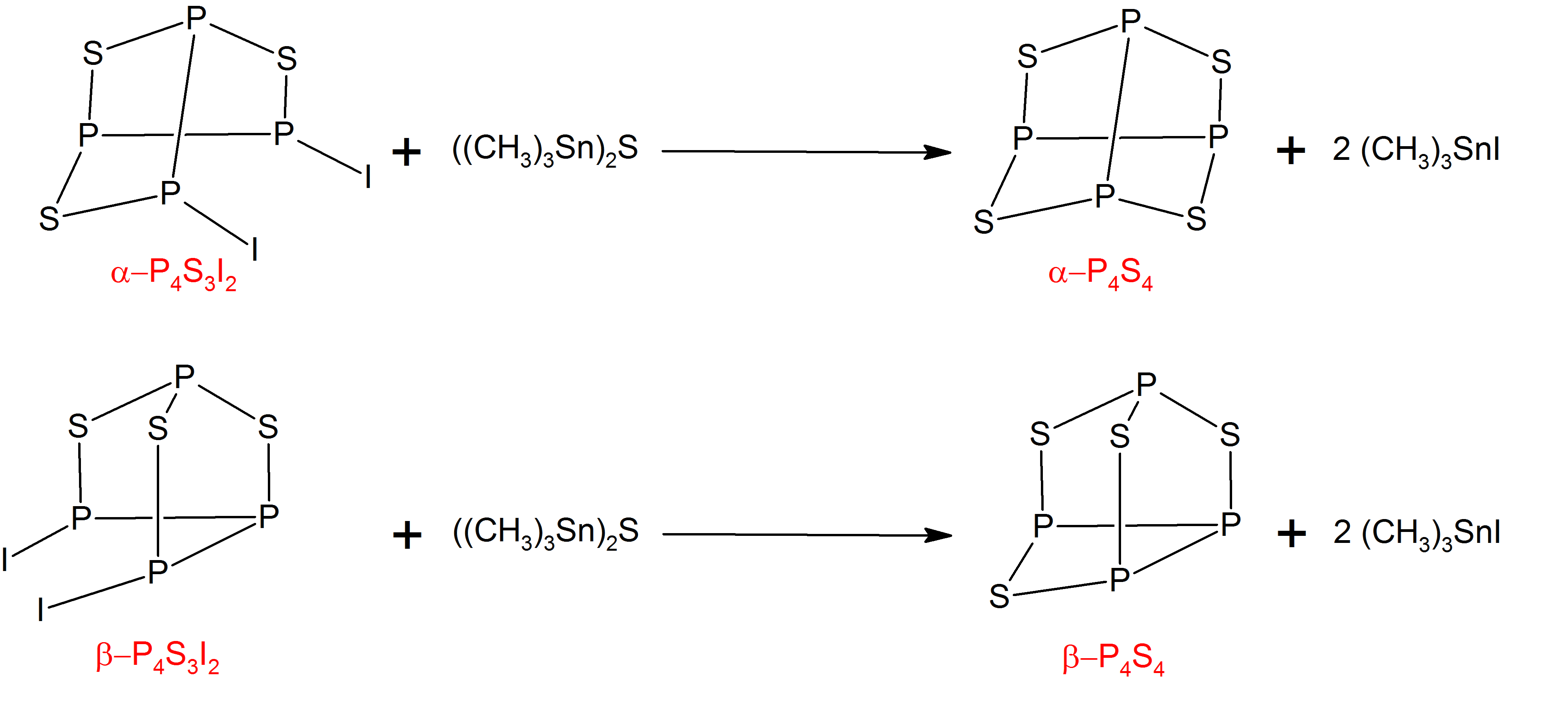

P_{4}S_{3}I_{2} can be synthesized by the reaction of stoichiometric amounts of phosphorus, sulfur, and iodine.

=== P_{4}S_{5} ===
P_{4}S_{5} can be prepared by treating stoichiometric amounts of P_{4}S_{3} with sulfur in carbon disulfide solution, in the presence of light and a catalytic amount of iodine. The respective product distribution is then analyzed by using ^{31}P-NMR spectroscopy.

In particular, α-P_{4}S_{5} can be easily made by the photochemical reaction of P_{4}S_{10} with red phosphorus. Note that P_{4}S_{5} is unstable when heated, tending to disproportionate to P_{4}S_{3} and P_{4}S_{7} before reaching its melting point.

=== P_{4}S_{6} ===
P_{4}S_{6} can be made by abstracting a sulfur atom from P_{4}S_{7} using triphenylphosphine:

P_{4}S_{7} + Ph_{3}P → P_{4}S_{6} + Ph_{3}PS

Treating α-P_{4}S_{5} with Ph_{3}AsS in CS_{2} also yields α-P_{4}S_{6}. The two new polymorphs δ-P_{4}S_{6} and ε-P_{4}S_{6} can be made by treating α-P_{4}S_{4} with Ph_{3}SbS in CS_{2}.

=== P_{4}S_{7} ===
P_{4}S_{7} is most conveniently made by direct union of the corresponding elements, and is one of the most easily purified binary phosphorus sulfides.

P_{4} + 7 S → P_{4}S_{7}

=== P_{4}S_{8} ===
β-P_{4}S_{8} can be made by treating α-P_{4}S_{7} with Ph_{3}AsS in CS_{2}, which yields a mixture between α-P_{4}S_{7} and β-P_{4}S_{8}.

=== P_{4}S_{9} ===
P_{4}S_{9} can be made by two methods. One method involves the heating of P_{4}S_{3} in excess sulfur. Another method involves the heating of P_{4}S_{7} and P_{4}S_{10} in 1:2 mole ratio, where P_{4}S_{9} is reversibly formed:

P_{4}S_{7} + 2 P_{4}S_{10} ⇌ 3 P_{4}S_{9}

=== P_{4}S_{10} ===
P_{4}S_{10} is one of the most stable phosphorus sulfides. It is most easily made by heating white phosphorus with sulfur above 570 K in an evacuated tube.

P_{4} + 10 S → P_{4}S_{10}

== See also ==
- Diphosphorus heptasulfide ((P_{2}S_{7})_{n})
- Diphosphorus trisulfide (P_{2}S_{3})
