= Diphosphorus trisulfide =

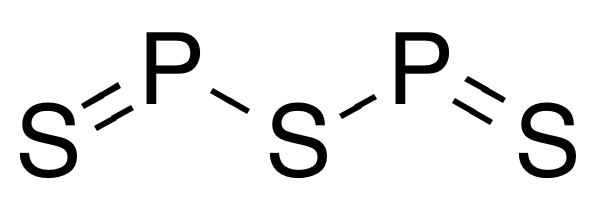

Names
- IUPAC name Phosphorus trisulfide
- Systematic IUPAC name Diphosphorus trisulfide
- Other names Diphosphathiane-1,3-dithione; Phosphorus(III) sulfide

Identifiers
CAS Number	12165-69-4
3D model (JSmol)	Interactive image
ChemSpider	14346688
ECHA InfoCard	100.032.094
EC Number	235-317-5
PubChem CID	16211604
UN number	1343
CompTox Dashboard (EPA)	DTXSID30923915
- InChI: InChI=1S/P2S3/c3-1-5-2-4 Key: XQNIYBBHBZAQEC-UHFFFAOYSA-N
- SMILES: P(=S)SP=S

Properties
Chemical formula	P_{2}S_{3}
Molar mass	158.13 g·mol^{−1}
- Except where otherwise noted, data are given for materials in their standard state (at 25 °C [77 °F], 100 kPa). Infobox references

Diphosphorus trisulfide (sometimes called phosphorus trisulfide) is a hypothetical phosphorus sulfide with the formula of P_{2}S_{3}. In contrast, the formal dimer P_{4}S_{6} is well-known.

== History ==
Early reports that diphosphorous trisulfide could be formed by heating red phosphorus and sulfur were shown to be incorrect by Helff in 1893. Its existence was again reported by Ralston and Wilkinson in 1928. In 1959, Pitochelli and Audrieth attempted to prepare P_{2}S_{3} via the reaction 2PCl_{3} + 3H_{2}S → P_{2}S_{3} + 6HCl, instead obtaining an equimolar mixture of P_{4}S_{5} and P_{4}S_{7} following recrystallization in carbon disulfide. In 1997, Lohr and Sundholm published a theoretical analysis of the potential structures of this molecular substance.

In 2017, Xiao proposed that a 2D crystallisation of P_{2}S_{3} was possible based on computer simulations. Xiao suggested that nanoribbons and nanotubes of the material may have applications in semiconductor electronics.

== Bibliography ==
- Lohr, Lawrence L.; Sundholm, Dage, "An ab initio characterization of diphosphorus trisulfide, P_{2}S_{3}", Journal of Molecular Structure, vol. 413–414, pp. 495–500, 30 September 1997. doi:10.1016/S0022-2860(97)00142-7
- Pitochelli, A.R.; Audrieth, L.F., "Concerning the existence of diphosphorus trisulfide", Journal of the American Chemical Society, vol. 81, iss. 17, pp. 4458–4460, 1 September 1959. doi:10.1021/ja01526a005
- Ralston, A.W.; Wilkinson, J.A., "Reactions in liquid hydrogen sulfide. III thiohydrolysis of chlorides", Journal of the American Chemical Society, vol. 50, iss. 2, pp. 258–264, 1 February 1928. doi:10.1021/ja01389a002
- Xiao, Hang, Low-Dimensional Material: Structure-Property Relationship and Applications in Energy and Environmental Engineering (PhD Dissertation), Columbia University ProQuest Dissertations Publishing, no. 10615524, 2017.
