= Malathion =

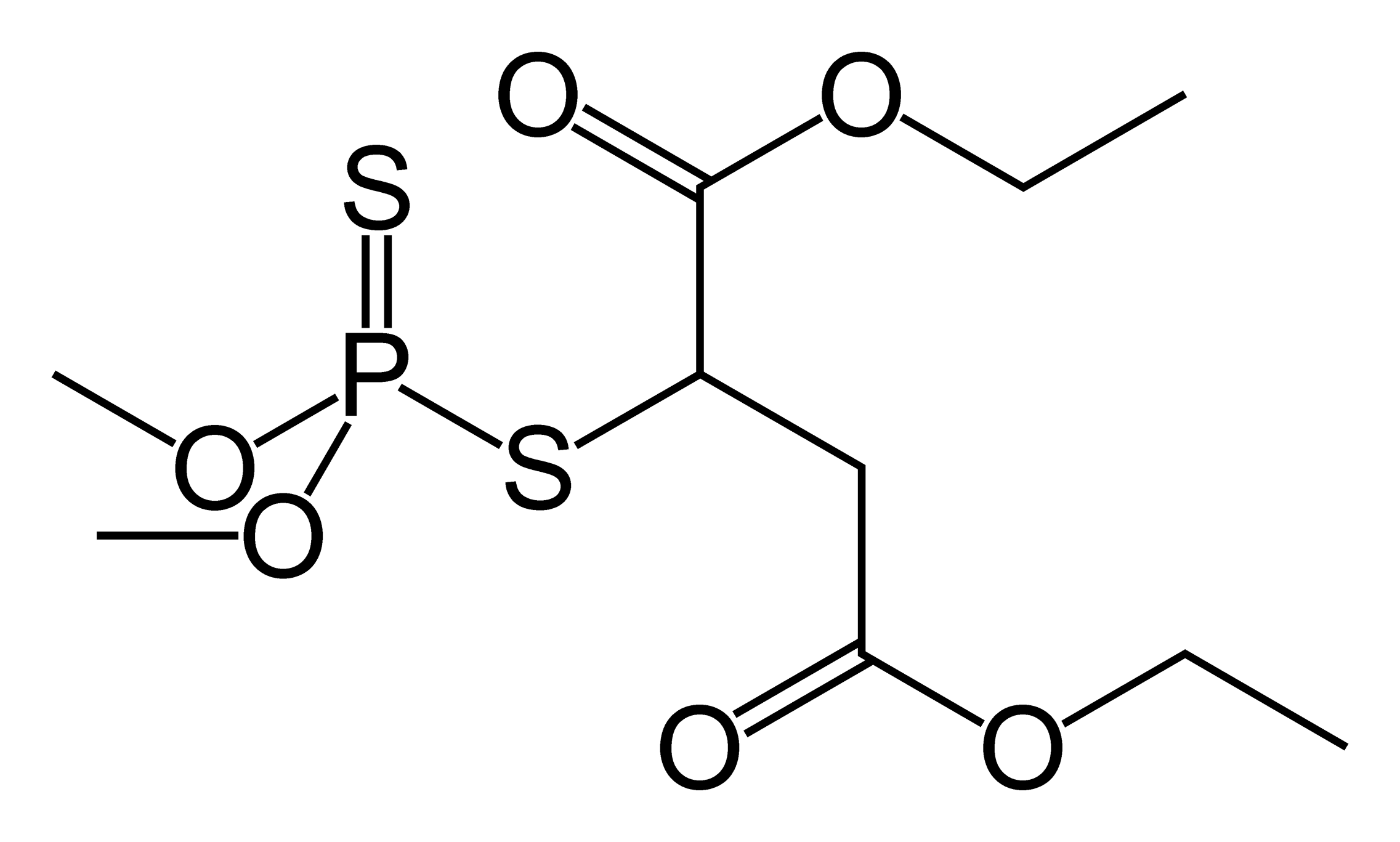
- Structural formula of malathion

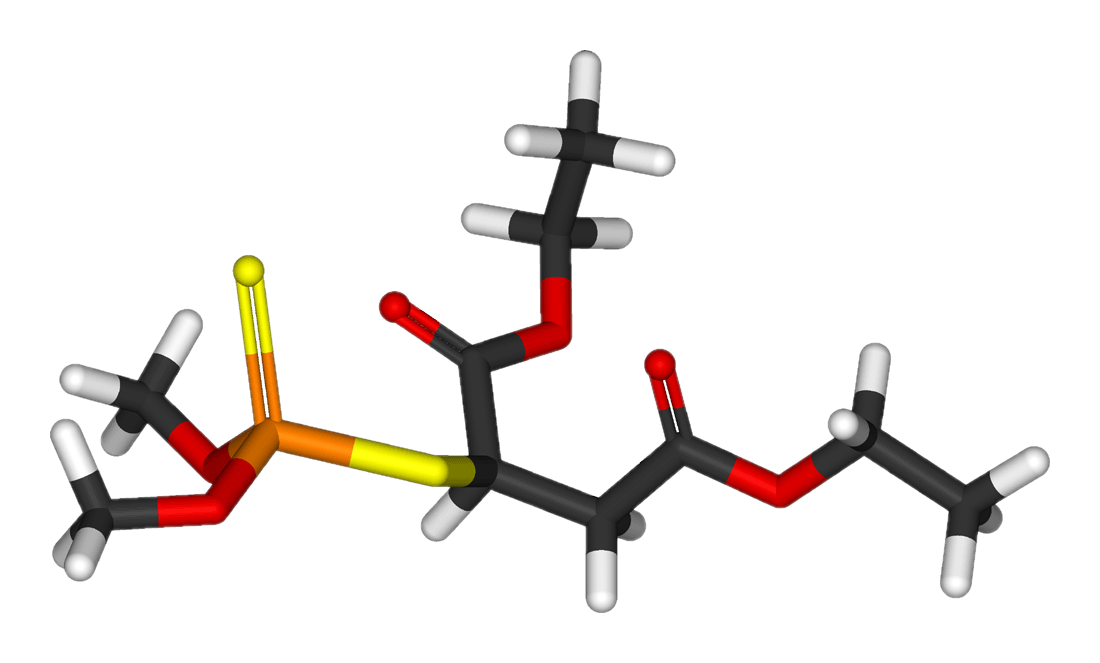
- 3D representation of malathion

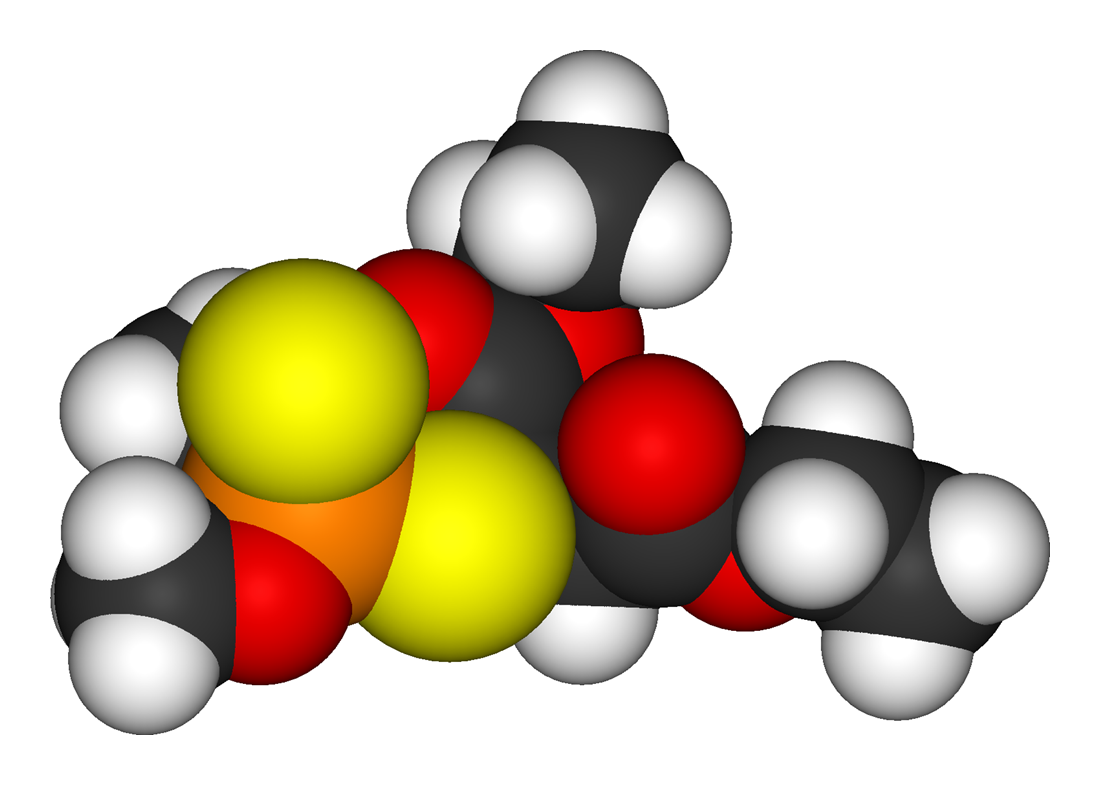
- Space filling model of malathion, showing van der Waals radii for each atom

Names
- IUPAC name Diethyl 2-[(dimethoxyphosphorothioyl)sulfanyl]butanedioate
- Other names: 2-(Dimethoxyphosphinothioylthio) butanedioic acid diethyl ester; S-(1,2-Dicarbethoxyethyl) O,O-dimethyldithiophosphate; Carbofos; Maldison; Mercaptothion

Identifiers
CAS Number	121-75-5
3D model (JSmol)	Interactive image
ChEBI	CHEBI:6651
ChEMBL	ChEMBL1200468
ChemSpider	3864
DrugBank	DB00772
ECHA InfoCard	100.004.089
KEGG	D00534
PubChem CID	4004
UNII	U5N7SU872W
CompTox Dashboard (EPA)	DTXSID4020791
- InChI: InChI=1S/C10H19O6PS2/c1-5-15-9(11)7-8(10(12)16-6-2)19-17(18,13-3)14-4/h8H,5-7H2,1-4H3 Key: JXSJBGJIGXNWCI-UHFFFAOYSA-N; InChI=1/C10H19O6PS2/c1-5-15-9(11)7-8(10(12)16-6-2)19-17(18,13-3)14-4/h8H,5-7H2,1-4H3 Key: JXSJBGJIGXNWCI-UHFFFAOYAK
- SMILES: O=C(OCC)C(SP(=S)(OC)OC)CC(=O)OCC

Properties
Chemical formula	C_{10}H_{19}O_{6}PS_{2}
Molar mass	330.35 g·mol^{−1}
Appearance	Clear colorless liquid
Odor	mercaptan-like, skunk-like, or garlic
Density	1.23 g/cm^{3}
Melting point	2.9 °C (37.2 °F; 276.0 K)
Boiling point	156 to 157 °C (313 to 315 °F; 429 to 430 K) at 0.7 mmHg (93 Pa)
Solubility in water	145 mg/L (20 °C (68 °F; 293 K))
Solubility in diethyl ether	very soluble
Solubility in ethanol	soluble
Solubility in acetone	soluble
log P	2.36 (octanol/water)

Pharmacology
ATC code	P03AX03 (WHO) QP53AF12 (WHO)

Hazards
- GHS labelling
Pictograms	(GHS07: Exclamation mark) (GHS09: Environmental hazard)
Signal word	Warning
Hazard statements	H302, H317, H410
Precautionary statements	P261, P264, P270, P272, P273, P280, P301+P312+P330, P302+P352, P333+P313, P363, P391, P501
Flash point	163 °C; 325 °F; 436 K (greater than)
- Lethal dose or concentration (LD, LC)
LD_{50} (median dose)	5400 mg/kg (oral, rat, male); 5700 mg/kg (oral, rat, female); >2000 mg/kg (dermal, rat); 644 mg/kg (oral, rat); 8790 mg/kg (dermal, rabbit)
LC_{50} (median concentration)	>5.2 mg/L (inhalation, rat)
- NIOSH (US health exposure limits)
PEL (Permissible)	15 mg/m^{3} (TWA, skin)
REL (Recommended)	10 mg/m^{3} (TWA, skin)
IDLH (Immediate danger)	250 mg/m^{3}
- Except where otherwise noted, data are given for materials in their standard state (at 25 °C [77 °F], 100 kPa). verify (what is ?) Infobox references

Malathion is an organophosphate insecticide which acts as an acetylcholinesterase inhibitor. In the USSR, it was known as carbophos, in New Zealand and Australia as maldison and in South Africa as mercaptothion.

== Pesticide use ==
Malathion is a pesticide that is widely used in agriculture, residential landscaping, public recreation areas, and in public health pest control programs such as mosquito eradication. In the US, it is the most commonly used organophosphate insecticide.

A malathion mixture with corn syrup was used in the 1980s in Australia to combat the Mediterranean fruit fly. In Canada and the US starting in the early 2000s, malathion was sprayed in many cities to combat west Nile virus.

In the United Kingdom, malathion was withdrawn from sale in 2002.

== Mechanism of action ==
Malathion is an acetylcholinesterase inhibitor, a diverse family of chemicals. Upon uptake into the target organism, it binds irreversibly to the serine residue in the active catalytic site of the cholinesterase enzyme. The resultant phosphoester group is strongly bound to the cholinesterase, and irreversibly deactivates the enzyme which leads to rapid build-up of acetylcholine at the synapse.

== Production method ==
Malathion is produced by the addition of dimethyl dithiophosphoric acid to diethyl maleate or diethyl fumarate in the presence of catalytic amounts of triethylamine and hydroquinone at elevated temperature:

(CH_{3}O)_{2}PS_{2}H + C_{8}H_{12}O_{4} → C_{10}H_{19}O_{6}PS_{2}

This process produces the S enantiomer.

== Medical use ==
Malathion in low doses (0.5% preparations) is used as a treatment for head lice and body lice infection (pediculosis) in the US, where it is approved by the US Food and Drug Administration. In some areas in the UK, head lice had developed a resistance to malathion as of 1999, and it was ineffective against 64% of cases. This is believed to be caused by development in the lice of an enzyme-mediated malathion specific esterase, able to destroy malathion bound to the acetylcholine receptor.

It is also used for the treatment of scabies.

Preparations include Derbac-M, Prioderm, Quellada-M and Ovide.

== Risks ==
=== General ===
Malathion is of low toxicity. In arthropods it is metabolized into malaoxon which is 61 times more toxic, being a more potent inhibitor of acetylcholinesterase. In studies of the effects of long-term exposure to oral ingestion of malaoxon in rats, malaoxon has been shown to be 61 times more toxic than malathion, and malaoxon is 1,000 times more potent than malathion in terms of its acetylcholinesterase inhibition.

Absorption or ingestion into the human body also readily results in its metabolism to malaoxon, which is substantially more toxic. It is cleared from the body quickly, in three to five days. According to the United States Environmental Protection Agency, no reliable information is available on adverse health effects of chronic exposure.

In 1981, Malathion was sprayed over a 1,400 sq mi (3,600 km^{2}) area to control an outbreak of Mediterranean fruit flies in California. In order to demonstrate the chemical's safety, B. T. Collins, director of the California Conservation Corps, publicly swallowed a mouthful of dilute malathion solution.

=== Carcinogenicity ===
Malathion is classified by the IARC as probable carcinogen (group 2A). Malathion is classified by US EPA as having "suggestive evidence of carcinogenicity". This classification was based on the occurrence of liver tumors at excessive doses in mice and female rats and the presence of rare oral and nasal tumors in rats that occurred following exposure to very large doses. Exposure to organophosphates is associated with non-Hodgkin's lymphoma. Malathion used as a fumigant was not associated with increased cancer risk. Between 1993 and 1997, as part of the Agricultural Health Study, no clear association between malathion exposure and cancer was reported.

=== Toxicity to amphibians ===
Malathion is toxic to leopard frog tadpoles.

== Regulation ==
Different organizations and governments have set different drinking water quality standards for malathion.

The World Health Organization has determined that while malathion can last in water for months and years, it usually does not last in water for longer than one to two weeks; and since the amount of malathion found in drinking water is usually lower than a level that would lead to concerns about health that there is no need to set a drinking water guideline for the level of malathion allowed in water.

In contrast, the Canadian government has set a maximum acceptable concentration of 0.29 mg/L of malathion in drinking water, and requires that drinking water should be monitored for the chemical when there is a reason to suspect it is in the water and might need to be removed.

Australia has a much lower maximum level of 0.07 mg/L of malathion in drinking water.

The European Union has set their level still lower at 0.10 μg/L for any one pesticide in drinking water, including malathion.

The United States does not have an official maximum contaminant level for malathion, but proposes a lifetime health advisory of 0.5 mg/L.

== See also ==
- Isomalathion
- Pesticide toxicity to bees
