= Phosphorus pentasulfide =

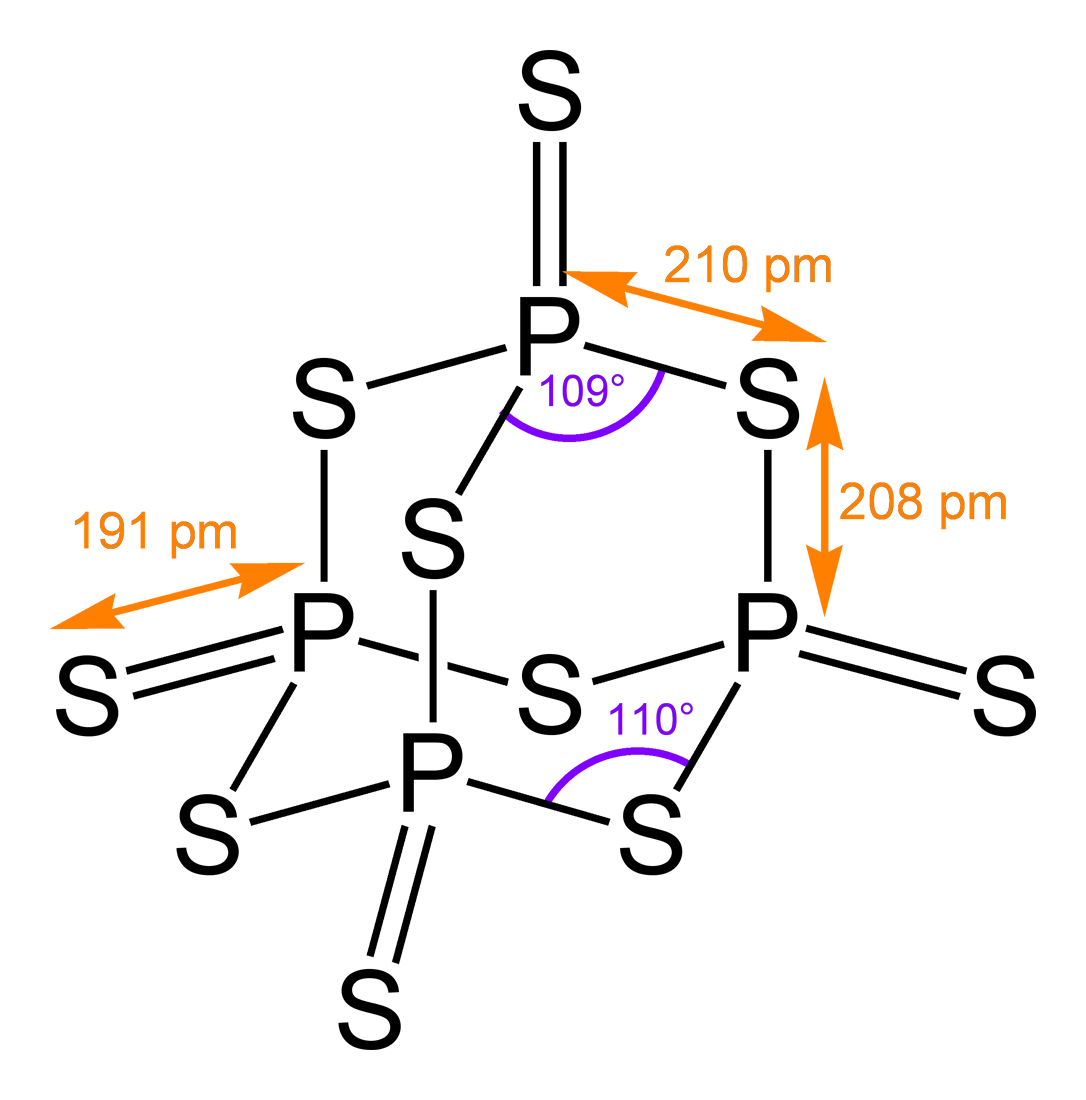
- Phosphorus decasulfide

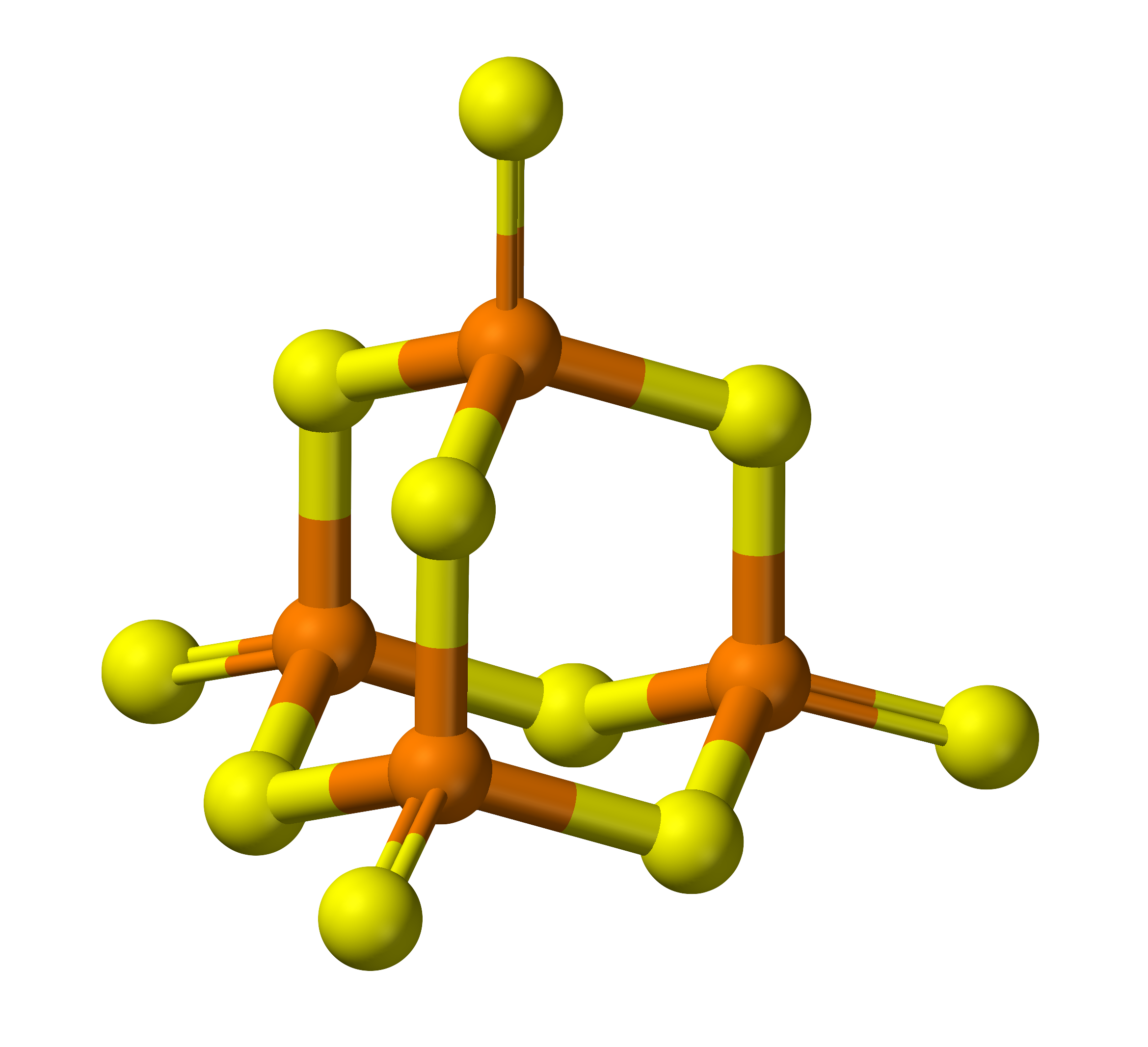
- Phosphorus decasulfide

Names
- Other names: Phosphorus sulfide; Sulfur phosphide; Phosphorus persulfide; Diphosphorus pentasulfide; Tetraphosphorus decasulfide; Phosphorus decasulfide

Identifiers
CAS Number	1314-80-3
3D model (JSmol)	Interactive image
ChemSpider	14133
ECHA InfoCard	100.013.858
EC Number	215-242-4
PubChem CID	14817
RTECS number	TH4375000
UNII	HJ1X20J1DX
CompTox Dashboard (EPA)	DTXSID0051659
- InChI: InChI=1S/P4S10/c5-1-9-2(6)12-3(7,10-1)14-4(8,11-1)13-2 Key: CYQAYERJWZKYML-UHFFFAOYSA-N; InChI=1/P4S10/c5-1-9-2(6)12-3(7,10-1)14-4(8,11-1)13-2 Key: CYQAYERJWZKYML-UHFFFAOYAD
- SMILES: P12(=S)SP3(=S)SP(=S)(S1)SP(=S)(S2)S3

Properties
Chemical formula	P_{4}S_{10}
Molar mass	444.50 g/mol
Appearance	Yellow solid
Odor	Rotten eggs
Density	2.09 g/cm^{3}
Melting point	288 °C (550 °F; 561 K)
Boiling point	514 °C (957 °F; 787 K)
Solubility in water	Hydrolyses
Solubility in other solvents	0.222 g in 100 g carbon disulfide (at 17 °C); Insoluble in benzene; Insoluble in hot xylene; Insoluble in hot anisole
Vapor pressure	1 mmHg (300 °C)

Structure
Crystal structure	triclinic, aP28
Space group	P1̅ (No. 2)
Point group	T_{d}

Hazards
- Lethal dose or concentration (LD, LC)
LD_{50} (median dose)	389 mg/kg (oral, rat)
- NIOSH (US health exposure limits)
PEL (Permissible)	TWA 1 mg/m^{3}
REL (Recommended)	TWA 1 mg/m^{3} ST 3 mg/m^{3}
IDLH (Immediate danger)	250 mg/m^{3}

Related compounds
Related compounds	Diphosphorus trisulfide; Phosphorus sesquisulfide; Phosphorus sulfides
- Except where otherwise noted, data are given for materials in their standard state (at 25 °C [77 °F], 100 kPa). verify (what is ?) Infobox references

Phosphorus pentasulfide is the inorganic compound with the formula P_{2}S_{5} (empirical) or P_{4}S_{10} (molecular). This yellow solid is the one of two phosphorus sulfides of commercial value. Samples often appear greenish-gray due to impurities. It is soluble in carbon disulfide but reacts with many other solvents such as alcohols, DMSO, and DMF.

== Structure and synthesis ==
Its tetrahedral molecular structure is similar to that of adamantane and almost identical to the structure of phosphorus pentoxide.

Phosphorus pentasulfide is obtained by the reaction of liquid white phosphorus (P_{4}) with sulfur above 300 °C. The first synthesis of P_{4}S_{10} by Berzelius in 1843 was by this method. Alternatively, P_{4}S_{10} can be formed by reacting elemental sulfur or pyrite, FeS_{2}, with ferrophosphorus, a crude form of Fe_{2}P (a byproduct of white phosphorus (P_{4}) production from phosphate rock):

4 Fe_{2}P + 18 S → P_{4}S_{10} + 8 FeS
4 Fe_{2}P + 18 FeS_{2} P_{4}S_{10} + 26 FeS

== Applications ==
Approximately 150,000 tons of P_{4}S_{10} are produced annually. The compound is mainly converted to other derivatives for use as lubrication additives such as zinc dithiophosphates. It is widely used in the production of sodium dithiophosphate for applications as a flotation agent in the concentration of molybdenite minerals. It is also used in the production of pesticides such as Parathion and Malathion. It is also a component of some amorphous solid electrolytes (e.g. Li_{2}S-P_{2}S_{5}) for some types of lithium batteries.

Phosphorus pentasulfide is a dual-use material, for the production of early insecticides such as Amiton and also for the manufacture of the related VX nerve agents.

Phosphorus pentasulfide reacts with ethanol to give diethyl dithiophosphoric acid:

P_{2}S_{5} + 4 C_{2}H_{5}OH → 2 (C_{2}H_{5}O)_{2}PS_{2}H + H_{2}S

Diorganodithiophosphoric acids are used to produce metal dithiophosphates, which are used commercially.

== Reactivity ==
Due to hydrolysis by atmospheric moisture, P_{4}S_{10} evolves hydrogen sulfide H_{2}S, thus P_{4}S_{10} is associated with a rotten egg odour. Aside from H_{2}S, hydrolysis of P_{4}S_{10} eventually gives phosphoric acid:

P_{4}S_{10} + 16 H_{2}O → 4 H_{3}PO_{4} + 10 H_{2}S

Other mild nucleophiles react with P_{4}S_{10}, including alcohols and amines. Reaction with ammonium chloride gives the polymeric (SPN)_{∞}. Aromatic compounds such as anisole, ferrocene and 1-methoxynaphthalene react to form 1,3,2,4-dithiadiphosphetane 2,4-disulfides such as Lawesson's reagent:

P_{4}S_{10} + 4 ArH → 2 [ArPS_{2}]_{2} + 2 H_{2}S (Ar = aryl)

=== Thionations ===
P_{4}S_{10} is used as a reagent for thionation (thiation). In doing so, P=S bonds are converted to P=O bonds, concomitant with C=O bonds converting to C=S. Some ketones, esters, and imides are converted to the corresponding thiocarbonyls. Amides give thioamides. With 1,4-diketones the reagent forms thiophenes. P_{4}S_{10} is also used to deoxygenate sulfoxides. Typical conditions entail boiling organic solvents (benzene, dioxane, or acetonitrile). Hexamethyldisiloxane is an effective solvent for these thionations because the phosphorus-containing side products are more easily separated from the products.

The use of P_{4}S_{10} has been displaced somewhat by the aforementioned Lawesson's reagent.

It is probable that thionation reactions involve dissociation of P_{4}S_{10} into more reactive species, perhaps P_{2}S_{5}. Supporting evidence is the reaction of P_{4}S_{10} with pyridine to form the complex P_{2}S_{5}(pyridine)_{2}.
