= Zinc dithiophosphate =

Lubricant additive

Structure of an ligand (L) adduct of a typical zinc bis(dithiophosphate) complex. Such zinc dithiophosphate complexes are usually pentacoordinate.

Zinc dialkyldithiophosphates (often referred to as ZDDP) are a family of coordination compounds classified as members of transition metal dithiophosphate complexes. These compounds were introduced in the 1940s as oil additives. They are uncharged compounds, not salts. They are soluble in nonpolar solvents, and the longer-chain derivatives easily dissolve in mineral and synthetic oils used as lubricants. They come under CAS number 68649-42-3 . In aftermarket oil additives, the percentage of ZDDP ranges approximately between 2 and 15%. Zinc dithiophosphates have many names, including ZDDP, ZnDTP, and ZDP.

== Applications ==
Selected zinc dithiophosphates
R group	Compound	Registry number	melting point (°C)
CH_{3}	Zn[S_{2}P(OMe)_{2}]_{2}	25502-69-6	-
C_{2}H_{5}	Zn[S_{2}P(OEt)_{2}]_{2}	7268-60-2	-
CH(CH_{3})_{2}	Zn[S_{2}P(OC−i−Pr)_{2}]_{2}	2929-95-5	131
C_{4}H_{9}	Zn[S_{2}P(OBu)_{2}]_{2}	6990-43-8	36.8
CH_{2}CH(CH_{3})_{2}	Zn[S_{2}P(OCH_{2}CHMe_{2})_{2}]_{2}	4563-55-7	107

The main application of ZDDPs are as anti-wear additives in lubricants including greases, hydraulic oils, and motor oils. ZDDPs also act as corrosion inhibitors and antioxidants. Concentrations in lubricants range from 600 ppm for modern, energy-conserving low-viscosity oils to 3000 ppm in some racing oils.

It has been reported that zinc and phosphorus emissions may damage catalytic converters and standard formulations of lubricating oils for gasoline engines now have reduced amounts of the additive due to the API limiting the concentration of this additive in new API SM and SN oils; however, this affects only 20- and 30-grade "ILSAC" oils. Grades 40 and higher have no regulation regarding the concentration of ZDDP, except for diesel oils meeting the API CJ-4 specification which have had the level of zddp reduced slightly, although most diesel Heavy-Duty Engine oils still have a higher concentration of this additive. Crankcase oils with reduced ZDDP have been cited as causing damage to, or failure of, classic/collector car flat-tappet camshafts and lifters which undergo very high boundary layer pressures and/or shear forces at their contact faces, and in other regions such as main bearings, and piston rings and pins. Roller camshafts/followers are more commonly used to reduce camshaft lobe friction in modern engines. There are additives, such as STP Oil Treatment, and some racing oils such as PurOl, PennGrade 1, and Valvoline VR-1, Kixx Hydraulic Oil which are available in the retail market with the necessary amount of ZDDP for engines using increased valve spring pressures.

=== Tribofilm formation mechanism ===
Various mechanisms have been proposed for how ZDDP forms protective tribofilms on solid surfaces. In-situ atomic-force microscopy (AFM) experiments show that the growth of ZDDP tribofilms increases exponentially with both the applied pressure and temperature, consistent with a stress-promoted thermal activation reaction rate model. Subsequently, experiments with negligible solid-solid contact demonstrated that film formation rate depends on the applied shear stress.

== Synthesis and structure ==
With the formula Zn[(S_{2}P(OR)_{2}]_{2}, zinc dithiophosphate features diverse R groups. Typically, R is a branched or linear alkyl between 1-14 carbons in length. Examples include 2-butyl, pentyl, hexyl, 1,3-dimethylbutyl, heptyl, octyl, isooctyl (2-ethylhexyl), 6-methylheptyl, 1-methylpropyl, dodecylphenyl, and others. A list of examples with their CAS numbers is here.

Zinc dithiophosphate are often produced in two steps. First phosphorus pentasulfide is heated with suitable alcohols (ROH) to give the dithiophosphoric acid. A wide variety of alcohols can be employed, which allows the lipophilicity of the final zinc product to be fine tuned. The resulting dithiophosphoric acid is then neutralized, e.g., with ammonia or by adding zinc oxide:

P_{2}S_{5} + 4 ROH → 2 (RO)_{2}PS_{2}H + H_{2}S
2 (RO)_{2}PS_{2}H + ZnO → Zn[(S_{2}P(OR)_{2}]_{2} + H_{2}O

Monomeric Zn[(S_{2}P(OR)_{2}]_{2} appear not to exist. Instead, these complexes exist as dimers in solution or polymers in the solid form. The dissociation constant for the dimers at room temperature is 10^{−2} M

[Zn[(S_{2}P(OR)_{2}]_{2}]_{2} ⇌ 2 Zn[(S_{2}P(OR)_{2}]_{2}

The dimers dissociate in the donor solvents (ethanol) or upon treatment with Lewis bases, forming adducts:

[Zn[(S_{2}P(OR)_{2}]_{2}]_{2} + 2 L → 2 LZn[(S_{2}P(OR)_{2}]_{2}

The polymers [Zn[(S_{2}P(OR)_{2}]_{2}]_{n} (n > 1) have also been characterized. For example, zinc diethyldithiophosphate, Zn[(S_{2}P(OEt)_{2}]_{2}, crystallizes as a polymers consisting of linear chains. Reaction of Zn[(S_{2}P(OR)_{2}]_{2} with additional zinc oxide gives rise to the oxygen-centered cluster, Zn_{4}O[(S_{2}P(OR)_{2}]_{6}, which adopts the structure seen for basic zinc acetate.

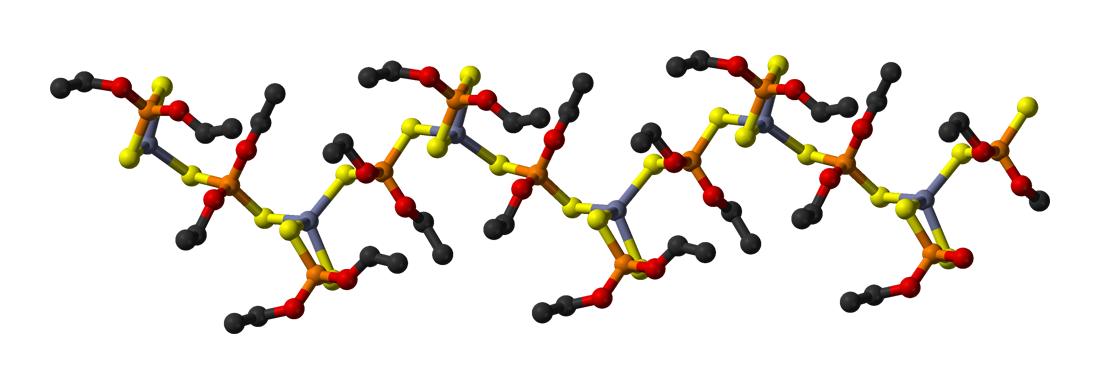
Ball-and-stick model of part of a chain of zinc diethyldithiophosphate. Color code: yellow = S
