= Extreme tribology =

Extreme tribology refers to tribological situations under extreme operating conditions which can be related to high loads and/or temperatures, or severe environments. Also, they may be related to high transitory contact conditions, or to situations with near-impossible monitoring and maintenance opportunities. In general, extreme conditions can typically be categorized as involving abnormally high or excessive exposure to e.g. cold, heat, pressure, vacuum, voltage, corrosive chemicals, vibration, or dust. The extreme conditions should include any device or system requiring a lubricant operating under any of the following conditions:

- Beyond the original machinery design specifications.
- Beyond the original machinery ambient parameters.
- Application in an environmentally sensitive location.
- Beyond the original lubricant design specification.

Operation in such extreme conditions is a challenge for tribologists to develop tribosystems that could meet these extreme requirements. Often, only multifunctional materials fulfill such requirements.

== Challenges in tribology ==
The progression of the humanity suggested new technologies, devices, materials and surface treatments which required novel lubricants and lubrication systems. Likewise, the development of high-speed trains, aircraft, space stations, computer hard discs, artificial implants, and bio-medical and many other engineering systems have only been possible through the advances in tribology. Challenges in tribology including sustainability, climate change and gradual degradation of the environment require new solutions and innovative approaches.

== Tribology at extreme temperatures ==
In many tribological applications, the system components are exposed to extreme temperatures (very high or ultra-low temperatures). Examples of such applications can be found in the aerospace, mining, power generation, metalworking industries, and steel plants. In tribology, an application can be considered to operate at elevated temperatures when the use of conventional lubricants, i.e. oils and greases is no longer effective due to their rapid decomposition at around 300 °C. Smart lubricating materials and multifunctional lubricating materials are developed as new class materials with increased safety, long-term durability and as less amount of repairing costs as possible. Such materials are designed to be self-diagnostic, self-repairing, and self-adjusting. These materials include structural/lubricating integrated material, anti-radiation lubricating material, conductive or insulation lubricating material, etc. At low temperatures and in cryogenic environments, liquid lubricants can solidify or become highly viscous and not be effective. On the other end, solid lubricants have usually been found to be better than liquid lubricants or greases. The most common solid lubricants for cryogenic temperature are polytetrafluoroethylene, polycarbonate, tungsten disulphide (WS_{2}), and molybdenum disulphide (MoS_{2}). In addition, ice could be a possible lubricant for deformation in cryogenic environments which provides a method of self-lubrication in the sense that no active mechanism is needed to supply a lubricant.

== Tribology at micro/nano-scale ==
The fundamental difference that distinguishes micro/nano tribology from classical macro tribology is that micro/nano tribology considers the friction and wear of two objects in relative sliding whose dimensions range from micro-scales down to molecular and atomic scales. MEMS refer to micro-electromechanical systems that have a characteristic length of 100 nm to 1 mm, while NEMS are the nano-electromechanical systems that have a characteristic length of less than 100 nm. There are great challenges in the development of a fundamental understanding of tribology, surface contamination and environment in MEMS/NEMS. One of these challenges in such extreme tribological situations is the adhesion force which can be up to a million times greater than the force of gravity. This is due to the fact that the adhesion force decreases linearly with size, whereas the gravitational force decreases with the size cubed. Low surface energy, hydrophobic coatings applied to oxide surfaces are promising for minimizing adhesion and static-charge accumulation.

== Tribology under vacuum conditions ==
Under vacuum environment, it is a problem to achieve acceptable endurance of tribological components due to the fact that the lubricant may either freeze, evaporate or decompose and hence become ineffective. Tribological properties of materials exhibit different characteristics at the space vacuum as compared to the atmospheric pressure. Adhesive and fatigue wear are the two important types of wear encountered in a vacuum environment. Vacuum not only radically affects the wear behavior of metals and alloys in contact, but also has a pronounced influence on nonmetals as well. Different new kinds of materials are developed for potentially operating in vacuum environments. For instance, CuZn_{39}Pb_{3} and Ni_{3}(Si,Ti) alloys have excellent anti-wear properties in all the vacuum conditions. Types of solid lubricants used in space applications:

- Soft metal films: gold, silver, lead, indium, and barium.
- Lamellar solids: molybdenum disulfide, tungsten disulfide, cadmium iodide, lead iodide, molybdenum diselenide, intercalated graphite, fluorinated graphite, and phthalocyanines.
- Polymers: polytetrafluoroethylene, polyimides, fluorinated ethylene-propylene, ultra-high-molecular-weight polyethylene UHMWPE, polyether ether ketone, polyacetal, and epoxy resins.
- Other low shear strength materials: fluorides of calcium, lithium, barium, and rare earths; sulfides of bismuth and cadmium; and oxides of lead, cadmium, cobalt, and zinc.

The most common way to utilize a solid lubricant is to apply it to a metal surface as a film or surface coating of a thin layer of soft film, typically molybdenum disulphide, artificially deposited on the surfaces. Coatings of solid lubricant are built up atom by atom yielding a mechanically strong surface layer with a long service life and the minimum quantity of solid lubricant.

== Geotribology ==
The term "geotribology" was first stated by Harmen Blok with no significant discussion. Later, geotribology framework was employed to analyze the flow mechanics of granular sand. Even though tribological concepts can be utilized to many geosciences phenomena, the two research communities are separated. In earth science, many tribological concepts were applied successively, particularly in rock friction analyses. The asperity-asperity contact mechanism was applied to rock friction experiments that led to the rate-state friction law that prevails in earthquake analyses.

== Tribology in high dust and dirty areas ==
High dust areas and dirt environments can weigh profoundly on a lubricant due to the high risk of particle contamination. These contaminants readily form a grinding paste, causing failure of tribosystems and subsequently damaging of equipment. This type of contamination most frequently takes place when airborne or stagnant particles gain access to the lubrication system through open ports and hatches, especially in systems with negative pressure. Half of a bearing loss of usefulness can be attributed to wear. This wear, which occurs through surface abrasion, fatigue and adhesion, is often the result of particle contamination.

== Tribology in radiation environments ==
In radiation environments, liquid lubricants can decompose. Suitable solid lubricants can extend the operation of systems beyond 10^{6} rads while maintaining relatively low coefficients of friction.

== Tribology for limited weight applications ==
In weight-limited spacecraft and rovers, solid lubrication has the advantage of weighing substantially less than liquid lubrication. The elimination (or limited use) of liquid lubricants and their replacement by solid lubricants would reduce spacecraft weight and, therefore, have a dramatic impact on mission extent and craft maneuverability.
