= Ernest Rabinowicz =

Ernest Rabinowicz (1927-2006) was an American mechanical engineer. He was known for his work in tribology at Massachusetts Institute of Technology (MIT).

== Education ==
Rabinowicz received his bachelor's degree in physics from the University of Cambridge in 1947. In 1950, he obtained a doctor of philosophy in physical chemistry from the University of Cambridge under the supervision of David Tabor.

== Research ==
Rabinowicz joined the research staff at MIT in 1950, becoming a professor in 1967. He was best known for his research on the friction and wear of materials. He also wrote several popular science articles on tribology topics in Scientific American. His seminal book "Friction and Wear of Materials" was first published in 1965. According to Google Scholar, his work has been cited on more than 10,000 occasions.

As well as teaching students at MIT, Rabinowicz developed and taught a popular extension course on Friction and Wear to many engineers and scientists from industry. His lectures and teaching videos reached a wide audience and made him one of the best known teachers of tribology in the United States, if not the world.

== Awards ==
Rabinowicz has been awarded the three most prestigious tribology awards. In 1985, he received the Mayo D. Hersey Award from the American Society of Mechanical Engineers. In 1988, he received the International Award from the Society of Tribologists and Lubrication Engineers. In 1998, he was awarded the Tribology Gold Medal by the Institution of Mechanical Engineers.
