= Hong Liang =

Chinese-American nanotribologist

Hong Liang is a Chinese-American surface and interface scientist whose research focuses on the structure and properties of nanoparticles and their tribological applications. She is Oscar S. Wyatt Jr. Professor and professor of mechanical engineering at Texas A&M University, past president of the Society of Tribologists and Lubrication Engineers, and editor-in-chief of Tribology International.

== Research ==
Liang's research focuses on materials science, tribology, and nanotechnology, converging in the field of nanotribology, which studies friction, wear, lubrication, and interfaces. The applications she has applied include nanoparticle lubricants and polishing agents, the use of gold nanoparticles as antibiotics, the use of luminous nanoparticles in fluorescence imaging for cancer diagnosis, and the use of plant-based lignin nanoparticles in supercapacitor-based electrical storage.

Beyond nanotechnology, Liang has also experimented with titanium gold alloys for fabricating super-hard and smooth ends of artificial joints, and with hybrid microrobots that fuse electronics with living cockroaches, allowing electronic control of the insect's nervous system and body.

== Education and career ==
Liang has a bachelor's degree from the Beijing Steel and Iron Institute, now the University of Science and Technology Beijing. She studied materials science as a graduate student at the Stevens Institute of Technology, where she earned a master's and Ph.D. with Traugott Fischer as her doctoral advisor.

After postdoctoral research with Said Jahanmir at the National Institute of Standards and Technology, she took a faculty position at the University of Alaska Fairbanks in 1998. In 2004, she moved to her present position at Texas A&M University, where she was Charles H. Barclay Jr. 45 Faculty Fellow and was named the Oscar S. Wyatt Jr. Professor in 2017. She took a leave in 2018–2019 to serve as ASME Foundation Swanson Fellow in the National Institute of Standards and Technology, where she served as assistant director of research partnerships for the Advanced Manufacturing National Program.

She was elected as president of the Society of Tribologists and Lubrication Engineers, for the 2023–2024 term, and has been co-editor-in-chief of Tribology International since 2015.

== Books ==
Liang is the coauthor of Tribology in Chemical-Mechanical Planarization (with David Craven, Taylor & Francis, 2004). Her edited volumes include Mechanical Tribology: Materials, Characterization, and Applications (with George E. Totten, Marcel Dekker, 2004).

== Recognition ==
Liang was named an ASME Fellow. She is also a fellow of the Society of Tribologists and Lubrication Engineers.
