= Ali Erdemir =

Turkish American Materials scientist

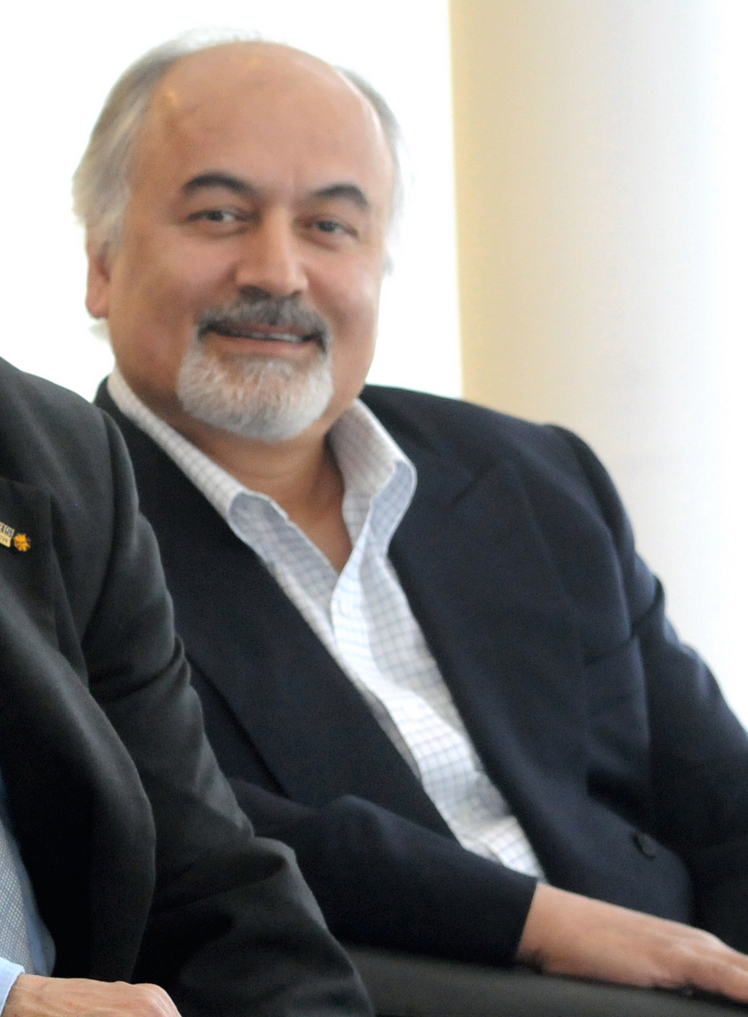
- Ali Erdemir, June 2010, at Argonne National Laboratory
- Born: Adana, Turkey
- Education: Istanbul Technical University; Georgia Institute of Technology
- Known for: Distinguished contributions to the science and technology of tribology, including its worldwide impact on carbon emissions
- Awards: 2019 National Academy of Engineering; 2018 AAAS Fellow; 2015 Mayo D. Hersey Award
- Scientific career
- Fields: Materials Science, Surface Science, Tribology
- Workplaces: Argonne National Laboratory, Texas A&M
- Website: engineering.tamu.edu/mechanical/profiles/erdemir-ali.html

Ali Erdemir, born on July 2, 1954, in Kadirli, Adana, Turkey, is a Turkish American materials scientist specializing in surface engineering and tribology.

== Education and career ==
Erdemir graduated from the Metallurgy Department of the Istanbul Technical University in 1977. After working for two years at the İskenderun Iron and Steel Company in Turkey as an engineer, he went to the USA for doctoral studies. Erdemir received a master's degree in materials engineering and a doctorate in materials science and engineering from the Georgia Institute of Technology in 1982 and 1986, respectively. After completing his military service in Turkey, Erdemir began in 1987 to work as an assistant metallurgist at the Argonne National Laboratory near Chicago, which is operated by the University of Chicago for the U.S. Department of Energy. In 2020, he relocated to Texas, where he is currently holds an appointment as an Eminent Professor in the Department of Mechanical Engineering at Texas A&M University in College Station, Texas.

== Recognition and awards ==
Erdemir is member of several professional societies and has published more than 100 scientific papers in the fields of friction, wear, lubrication of materials and coatings.

He was awarded an honorary doctorate degree from the Anadolu University, Eskişehir, Turkey in 1998.

Erdemir has been awarded international prizes including R&D 100 Awards in 1991, 1998 and 2003 for a boric acid lubricant and carbon coatings with very low friction coefficients. He has patent rights for six of his inventions.

He received the Mayo D. Hersey Award from the American Society of Mechanical Engineers in 2015.

In 2019, Erdemir was elected a member of the National Academy of Engineering for contributions to the science and technology of friction, lubrication, and wear.

He was awarded the International Award from the Society of Tribologists and Lubrication Engineers (STLE) in 2020.

He is currently President of the International Tribology Council.
