= Frank Philip Bowden =

Australian physicist (1903–1968)

Professor Frank Bowden
- Born: Frank Philip Bowden; 2 May 1903; Hobart, Tasmania
- Died: 3 September 1968 (aged 65)
- Education: University of Tasmania (B.S., 1925)(M.S., 1927); University of Cambridge (Ph.D., 1929)
- Awards: Elliott Cresson Medal (1955); Rumford Medal (1956); Fellow of the Royal Society
- Scientific career
- Thesis: The mechanism of electrode reactions (1929)

Frank Philip Bowden CBE FRS (2 May 1903 – 3 September 1968) was an Australian physicist.

== Early life ==
He was born in Hobart, Tasmania, the son of telegraph engineer Frank Prosser Bowden.

Bowden received his Bachelor of Science degree from the University of Tasmania in Australia in 1925, a Master of Science degree there in 1927 and a Doctor of Science (D.Sc.) degree in 1933, by which time he was working at the University of Cambridge in England. He gained his PhD from Cambridge in 1929.

== Career ==
Between 1931 and 1939, Bowden worked as a lecturer in physical chemistry at the University of Cambridge. He moved back to Australia in 1939 to work at the Commonwealth Scientific and Industrial Research Organisation. He returned to Britain in 1946 as a reader in physical chemistry.

In 1957, Bowden became Reader of Physics at Cambridge, and in 1966 became the Professor of Surface Physics. He made significant contributions to the field of tribology and he received the International Award from the Society of Tribologists and Lubrication Engineers in 1955. He was also named as one of 23 "Men of Tribology" by Duncan Dowson. Much of Bowden's tribology research was performed alongside David Tabor, with whom he published his popular book 'The Friction and Lubrication of Solids'.

Bowden died on 3 September 1968.

== Private life ==
He married Tasmanian Margot Hutchison in London in 1931. They had 3 sons and a daughter.

== Honours and awards ==
- 1938 Awarded Beilby Medal and Prize by the Royal Society of Chemistry
- 1948 Elected a Fellow of the Royal Society.
- 1955 Awarded the Franklin Institute's Elliott Cresson Medal.
- 1955 Awarded the International Award from the STLE.
- 1956 Awarded CBE in the 1956 Birthday Honours.
- 1956 Awarded the Rumford Medal of the Royal Society "In recognition of his distinguished work on the nature of friction".
- 1968 Awarded the Glazebrook Medal of the Institute of Physics
- 1968 Awarded the Bernard Lewis Gold Medal of the Combustion Institute
