= Space tribology =

Tribological systems for spacecraft applications

Space tribology is a discipline in the field of tribology which deals with tribological systems for spacecraft applications. Research in the field aims to design reliable tribological systems that can withstand the harsh environment of space.

== Challenges ==
In addition to regular tribological stresses, machine elements for space applications need to withstand the harsh environment during launch and in orbit. In particular, critical tribosystem inputs are:

- random vibrations and acoustic noise during launch, leading to high transient loads and high-frequency, low-amplitude motion that may cause fretting
- extreme temperatures and temperature fluctuations, "ranging from cryogenic temperature to several hundred degrees Celsius". This may lead to drastic changes in material properties, especially in case of lubricants.
- vacuum in the order of 10^{−7} to 10^{−13} mbar, leading to evaporation of lubricants. This can cause both lubrication failure and contamination of sensitive instruments.
- radiation, which degrades lubricants and other non-metallic components (although lubricants are rarely exposed to radiation directly)

== Lubricants for space applications ==
=== Liquid lubricants ===
Liquid lubricants for space applications need to have low vapor pressure (volatility) in order to withstand the high vacuum on orbit. Suitable lubricants include perfluoropolyethers, cyclopentanes and polyalphaolefins, mostly in the form of base oils for lubricating grease.

Since the rate of evaporation increases with temperature, the use of liquid lubricants is often limited to temperatures below 100 °C. On the other side of the spectrum, the viscosity of liquid lubricants increases with decreasing temperature; i.e., the lower the temperature, the more viscous the lubricant (see also viscosity index). Thus, the use of liquid lubricants is limited to temperatures of around -40 °C.

=== Solid lubricants ===
Solid lubricants are used for applications with extreme temperature or where evaporation of lubricants would cause damage to sensitive instruments.

Solid lubricants are applied in the form of coatings, or through self-lubricating materials. In the former case, sputtered molybdenum disulfide (MoS_{2}) and ion-plated lead (Pb) are commonly used; in the latter case, polyimide composite materials based on polytetrafluoroethylene (PTFE) are often employed, as well as leaded bronze.

== Applications ==
Space tribology ensures the reliable operation of mechanisms aboard spacecraft, which can be broadly grouped into one-shot devices (such as deployable solar panels, deployable antennas and solar sails), and continuously and intermittently operating devices (such as reaction wheels, electric motors and slip rings).
