= ESR Technology =

- Company type: Private
- Industry: Engineering
- Founded: 2005
- Headquarters: Warrington, England
- Number of locations: 3
- Area served: Worldwide
- Key people: Raghbir Chand (CEO)
- Services: Forensic Engineering, Space and Vacuum Tribology, Non-Destructive Testing, Safety and Risk Management
- Website: esrtechnology.com

ESR Technology was formerly the engineering, safety and risk business of AEA Technology, which was formed from the commercial arm of the United Kingdom Atomic Energy Authority. It specializes in the provision of technical expertise, products, and services to help customers ensure asset integrity, improve machine reliability, manage safety and risk, and transfer best practice. It has customers across many sectors, including oil and gas, rail, utilities, aviation, and space and defence. It operates three centres of excellence: the National Centre of Tribology, European Space Tribology Laboratory, and the National Non-Destructive Test Centre.

The company's main operations are located at Warrington (Head Office) in Cheshire, Milton (Oxfordshire) in England, and Aberdeen in Scotland.

== History ==
The United Kingdom Atomic Energy Authority (UKAEA) was established in 1954 as a UK government research organization responsible for the development of nuclear fusion power. The National Non-Destructive Testing Centre (NNDTC) was created at UKAEA's Harwell research establishment in 1967. The centre's formation created a central NDT research base in the UK. In 1982 from within the NNDTC the Harwell Offshore Inspection Service (HOIS) was formed as a joint industry project to improve the effectiveness of in-service inspection for the oil and gas industry. The UKAEA's Safety and Risk Directorate was at the forefront of developments such as Quantified Risk Assessment (QRA) that were transferred from the nuclear industry and applied within major hazard industries such as petrochemical, process, and oil and gas.

In 1966 the Jost Report was published, commissioned by the UK government which led to the development of Tribology as an inter-disciplinary study of friction, wear, and lubrication and the establishment of three tribology centres in the UK. The National Centre of Tribology (NCT) was one of them. Following from this in 1972 the European Space Research Organisation (now ESA) made the decision to create a Centre of Excellence in Space tribology to support Europe's early space industry. NCT won the contracts for this and the European Space Tribology Laboratory (ESTL) was created.

These four different divisions (NCT, HOIS, ESTL, and SRM) were joined in 1996 by the formation of AEA Technology, an offshoot of UKAEA offering expertise in a wide variety of areas including tribology, non-destructive testing, and quantified risk assessments.

In 2005 ESR Technology was formed out of a divestment by AEA Technology creating an independent engineering consultancy business specializing in forensic engineering, tribology, space tribology, safety and risk management, and non-destructive testing.
