= List of tribology organizations =

This is a list of organizations involved in research in or advocacy of tribology, the scientific and engineering discipline related to friction, lubrication and wear.

== Government ==
- Argonne National Laboratory
- NASA – Glenn Research Center
- National Center for Scientific Research (CNRS)
- National Research Council (Canada)
- Southwest Research Institute

== Advocacy and Professional societies ==
- American Bearing Manufacturers Association (ABMA)
- American Gear Manufacturers Association (AGMA)
- American Society of Mechanical Engineers (ASME)
- International Federation for the Promotion of Mechanism and Machine Science (IFToMM)
- Institution of Engineering and Technology
- Institution of Mechanical Engineers (IMechE)
- Institute of Physics
- Society of Tribologists and Lubrication Engineers (STLE) (USA)

== Publications ==
- Lubricants
- Proceedings of the Institution of Mechanical Engineers, Part J: Journal of Engineering Tribology
- Tribology Letters
- Tribology Transactions
- Wear

== Higher education ==
=== Austria ===
- TU Wien

=== Australia ===
- Curtin University
- University of New South Wales
- University of Western Australia

=== Belgium ===
- Ghent University
- KU Leuven

=== Brazil ===
- University of São Paulo
- Federal University of Uberlandia
- Federal University of Espírito Santo

=== Canada ===
- Dalhousie University
- University of Waterloo
- University of Windsor

=== China ===
- Chinese Academy of Sciences
- Chinese Academy of Sciences
- Tsinghua University
- Qingdao University of Technology

=== Chile ===
- Pontificia Universidad Católica de Chile (UC)

=== Czech Republic ===
- Brno University of Technology

=== Finland ===
- Tampere University

=== France ===
- Ecole Centrale de Lyon
- INSA Lyon / University of Lyon
- University of Poitiers

=== Germany ===
- Clausthal University of Technology (ITR)
- Karlsruhe Institute of Technology (KIT)
- Leibniz Universität Hannover (IMKT)
- Otto von Guericke University Magdeburg
- RWTH Aachen University
- Technische Universität Berlin
- Technical University of Munich

=== India ===
- Indian Institute of Science Bangalore
- Indian Institute of Technology Madras
- Indian Institute of Technology Delhi
- Indian Institute of Technology Kanpur
- Indian Institute of Technology (Indian School of Mines), Dhanbad
- Indian Institute of Technology Rupnagar
- National Institute of Technology Srinagar
- Indian Institute of Technology Tirupati
- Indian Institute of Technology Indore

=== Japan ===
- Kanazawa University
- Kobe University
- Nagoya University
- Niigata University
- Tokyo University

=== Korea ===
- KAIST
- Korea University
- Yonsei University
- Kookmin University

=== Malaysia ===
- International Islamic University Malaysia
- Universiti Malaya
- Universiti Kebangsaan Malaysia
- Universiti Teknologi MARA
- Universiti Teknikal Malaysia Melaka
- Universiti Teknologi Malaysia
- Universiti Sains Malaysia

=== Netherlands ===
- Delft University of Technology
- University of Twente

=== New Zealand ===
- Auckland University of Technology

=== Norway ===
- Norwegian University of Science and Technology

=== Pakistan ===
- National University of Science and Technology

=== Portugal ===
- Aveiro University
- University of Coimbra

=== Slovenia ===
- University of Ljubljana

=== Sweden ===
- Luleå University of Technology
- Uppsala University
- KTH Royal Institute of Technology

=== Switzerland ===
- EPFL
- ETH Zurich

=== United Kingdom ===
- Bournemouth University
- Cardiff University
- King's College London - Green Tribology Lab
- Imperial College London
- National Physical Laboratory
- University of Bradford
- University of Cambridge - Tribology Research Group
- University of Central Lancashire - Jost Institute for Tribotechnology
- University of Leeds - Institute of Functional Surfaces
- University of Leicester - Mechanics of Materials Research Group
- University of Loughborough - Dynamics Research Group
- University of Oxford - Solid Mechanics & Materials Engineering
- University of Sheffield - The Leonardo Tribology Centre
- University of Southampton - National Centre for Advanced Tribology (nCATs)
- University of Strathclyde

=== United States ===
- Auburn University - Multiscale Tribology Laboratory and the Undergraduate Tribology Minor
- Georgia Institute of Technology - Tribology Research Group
- George Mason University - Tribology and Surface Mechanics (TSM) Group
- Gonzaga University - Tribology Research Laboratory
- Iowa State University - Convergent Manufacturing, Processing and Advanced Surface Science (CoMPASS) Laboratory
- Lehigh University - Surface Interfaces and Materials Tribology Laboratory
- Louisiana State University - Center for Rotating Machinery
- Massachusetts Institute of Technology - Sloan Automotive Laboratory
- Miami University - Ye Research Group
- Northwestern University - Center for Surface Engineering and Tribology
- Pennsylvania State University - Tribology/Materials Processing Lab
- Purdue University - Mechanical Engineering Tribology Laboratory
- Rice University - Additive Manufacturing, Performance and Tribology Center
- Rochester Institute of Technology - Tribology Laboratory
- Texas A&M University - Rotor Dynamics Laboratory Tribology Group
- University at Buffalo - Dynamics, Control and Mechatronics
- University of Akron - Timken Engineered Surfaces Laboratories
- University of California, Berkeley - Tribology Group
- University of California, Merced - Tribology Group
- University of Dayton - Tribology Group
- University of Delaware - Materials Tribology Laboratory
- University of Florida - Tribology Laboratory
- University of Illinois Urbana-Champaign - Tribology and Microtribodynamics Laboratory
- University of Pennsylvania - Carpick Group
- University of Texas at Arlington - Turbomachinery and Energy Systems Laboratory
- University of Utah - Nanotribology and Precision Engineering Laboratory
- University of Nevada Reno
- University of Wisconsin - Madison - Eriten Research Group

== See also ==
- Tribology
- Friction
- Wear
- Lubrication
