= David Tabor (physicist) =

British physicist (1913-2005)

- Born: David Tabrisky; 23 October 1913; London, England
- Died: 26 November 2005 (aged 92); Cambridge, England
- Education: Imperial College London; University of Cambridge (Ph.D, 1939)
- Known for: Tabor parameter
- Spouse: Hannalene Stillschweig
- Awards: Tribology Gold Medal (1972); Guthrie Medal (1975); Royal Medal (1992); Fellow of the Royal Society
- Scientific career
- Fields: Physics; Contact mechanics
- Workplaces: University of Cambridge
- Doctoral students: Kevin Kendall; Alan D. Roberts; Jacob Israelachvili; Andrew Briggs

David Tabor (né Tabrisky), FRS (23 October 1913 – 26 November 2005) was a British physicist who was an early pioneer of tribology, the study of frictional interaction between surfaces, and well known for his influential undergraduate textbook Gases, Liquids and Solids.

== Early life and education ==
David Tabrisky was the sixth of seven children of Russian Jewish parents Charles (born "Ezekiel") Tabrisky and Rebecca (née Weinstein), who had emigrated to the United Kingdom and lived at Notting Hill Gate. His father had been a non-commissioned officer in, and armourer to, the Russian Imperial Army, and had run a business as a gunsmith and metalworker. On coming to England, he established a small metalworking business specialising in customised fittings and designs. Charles Tabrisky changed the family's surname to "Tabor" in the early 1920s. Tabor was educated at the Portobello Road Primary School, Regent Street Polytechnic Secondary School, and Imperial College London (to which he won a scholarship), then went to Cambridge to undertake research in the Department of Chemistry.

== Academic career ==
In 1957, Tabor was elected a Fellow of Gonville and Caius College, Cambridge. In 1964, the University of Cambridge appointed him Reader in Physics. From 1969 to 1981, he served as Head of Physics and Chemistry of Solids at the Cavendish Laboratory. In 1973, he was promoted to Professor of Physics. He was made Professor Emeritus when he retired in 1981. Much of Tabor's tribology research was performed alongside Frank Philip Bowden, with whom he published his popular book 'The Friction and Lubrication of Solids'.

== Honours ==
He was elected a Fellow of the Royal Society in 1963. He was awarded the Society of Tribologists and Lubrication Engineers International Award in 1965. In 1968 he was awarded the A. A. Griffith Medal and Prize. He was the first recipient of the Tribology Gold Medal, which is awarded by the Tribology Trust and administered by the Institution of Mechanical Engineers, in 1972. He was awarded the Mayo D. Hersey award from the American Society of Mechanical Engineers in 1974. He also received the Guthrie Medal of the Institute of Physics, 1975 and the Royal Society's Royal Medal, one of their three highest awards, 1992.

The David Tabor Medal and Prize from the Institute of Physics was named in his honour.

== Personal life ==
In 1943, Tabor married Hanna Stillschweig, who survived him with their two sons.
