= Open system tribology =

Open System Tribology is a field of tribology that studies tribological systems that are exposed to and affected by the natural environment.

== Overview ==
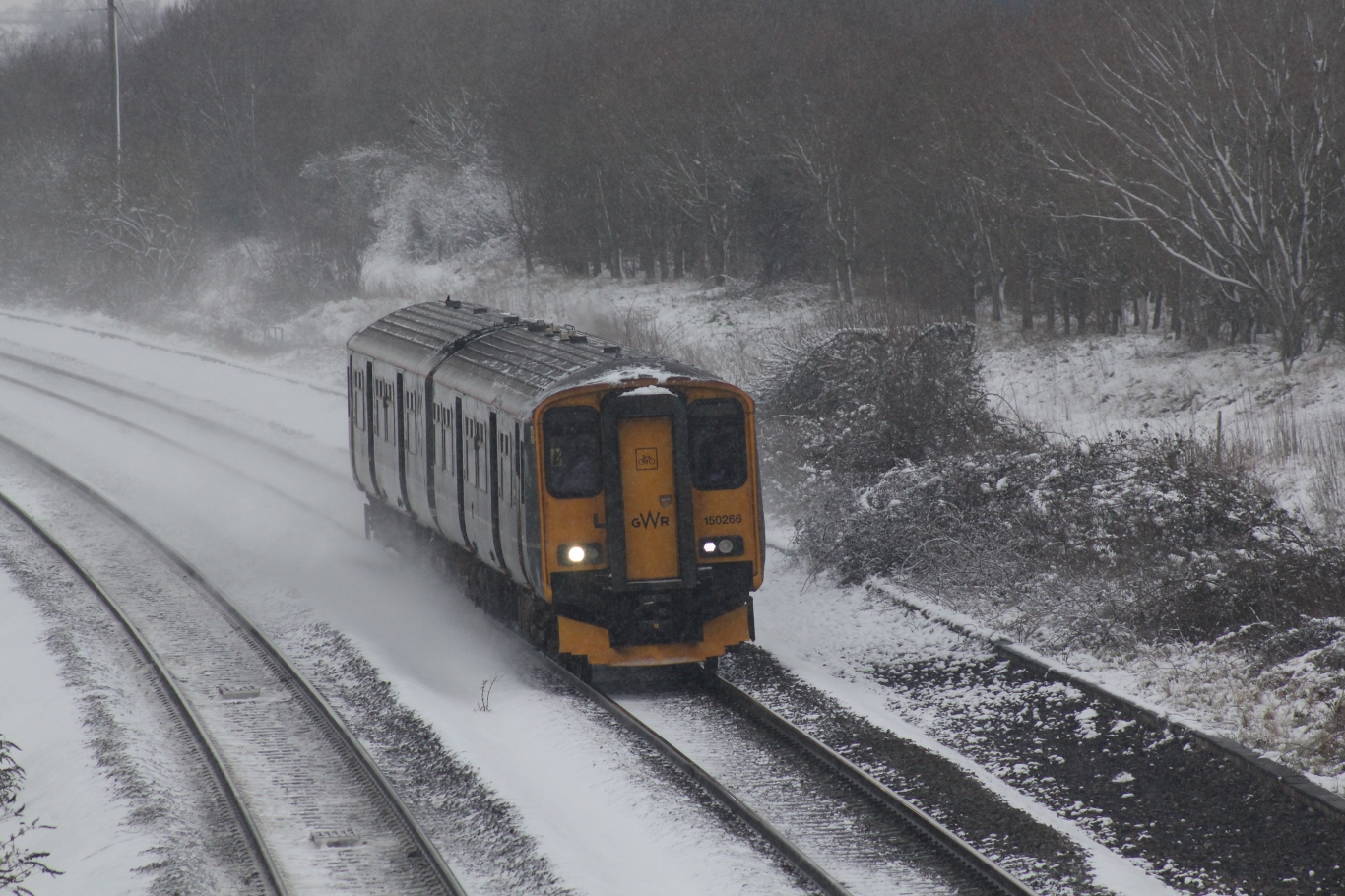
Open system tribology - wheel-rail contact in winter

Factors influencing the tribological process will vary with the operating environment. This environment may be closed or open. Closed systems (e.g., gears in a gearbox) are theoretically not affected by weather conditions. On the other hand, open systems are affected by weather conditions (i.e., precipitation, temperature, and humidity). For example, weather conditions will strongly influence the tribosystem formed in a ski-trail contact, and ski preparation specialists need to do a thorough work before a ski race. Another example is that of tire–road and wheel-rail contacts that are exposed to the external environment. Here, artificial and natural contaminants will exert an influence on friction and wear. Sound and airborne particles from the contacting surfaces are not contained and emit to the surrounding air. Tribology at the wheel-rail contact plays a key role in railway performance. Friction controls the tracking and braking, while wear affects reliability and endurance.

Temperature influences the tribological process by affecting the properties of the contacting surfaces. Polymers, for example, are harder at low temperatures than at room temperature.
