= Duncan Dowson =

British engineer (1928–2020)

Duncan Dowson CBE FRS FREng (31 August 1928 – 6 January 2020) was a British engineer who was Professor of Engineering Fluid Mechanics and Tribology at the University of Leeds.

== Early life and education ==
Dowson's father, Wilfrid Dowson, was an ornamental blacksmith, and as a child his son helped him in his work.

Dowson was educated at Lady Lumley's Grammar School in Pickering and then read Mechanical Engineering at the University of Leeds, from which he received the degrees of BSc, PhD and DSc.

== Academic career ==
After completing his PhD in 1952, Dowson worked as a research engineer at Sir W G Armstrong Whitworth Aircraft Company. He returned to the Department of Mechanical Engineering at Leeds as a lecturer in 1954, ultimately becoming professor of engineering fluid mechanics and tribology there.

Dowson was best known for his work on elastohydrodynamic lubrication. In 1974, he received the International Award from the Society of Tribologists and Lubrication Engineers. In 1979, he was awarded the Tribology Gold Medal by the Institution of Mechanical Engineers and the Robert Henry Thurston Lecture Award and Mayo D. Hersey Award from the American Society of Mechanical Engineers.

Dowson was Head of the Department of Mechanical Engineering at Leeds from 1987 to 1992 and director of the Institute of Tribology there from 1967 to 1986. He was also pro-vice-chancellor at Leeds from 1983 to 1985. He retired in 1993 with the title Emeritus Professor.

Dowson was President of the Institution of Mechanical Engineers in 1992. The Duncan Dowson prize is named in his honour.

In 2016, he presented the Higginson Lecture in Durham University.

== Honours ==
Dowson was elected a Fellow of the Royal Society (FRS) in 1987. He was made a Commander of the Most Excellent Order of the British Empire (CBE) in 1989. He was elected a Fellow for the Royal Academy of Engineering (FREng) in 1982.

Dowson received the following honorary degrees:

- DSc - Chalmers University of Technology - 1979
- Docteur - INSA Lyon - 1991
- DSc - University of Liège - 1995
- DEng - University of Waterloo - 2001
- DEng - University of Bradford - 2002
- DEng - University of Leeds - 2003
- DSc - Loughborough University - 2005

== Marriage ==
In 1951 Dowson married Mabel Strickland from Cropton in North Yorkshire, who had attended the same school. Mabel became a primary school headmistress. They had two sons and a daughter.

== Death ==
Dowson died on 6 January 2020 in Leeds at the age of 91. His wife died a few months later on 11 October 2020.

== Selected publications ==
- Duncan Dowson, Gordon Robert Higginson, Elastohydrodynamic Lubrication J. F. Archand, 1966; 2 edn, 1977
- History of Tribology Longman, 1979, ISBN 978-0-582-44766-0; Wiley, 1998, ISBN 978-1-86058-070-3
- Biomechanics of Joints and Joint Replacements (1981)
- Ball Bearing Lubrication (1981)
- Advances in medical tribology, Mechanical Engineering Publications, 1998, ISBN 978-1-86058-069-7
