= Tribofilm =

Physical films that form on contact-stressed lubricated surfaces

Tribofilms (boundary lubricant films, boundary lubricating films, tribo-boundary films or boundary films) are films that form on tribologically stressed surfaces. Tribofilms are mostly solid surface films that result from a chemical reaction of lubricant components or tribological surfaces.

Tribofilms play an important role in reducing friction and wear in lubricated systems. They form as a result of complex mechanochemical interactions between surface materials and lubricants, and the study of tribofilm formation processes is a major field of tribology.

Generally, a tribofilm is any film that forms in a tribosystem "as a result of interaction between chemical components of the [lubricant] with the lubricated surface". The term is mostly used to describe strongly bound films that are formed on tribologically stressed surfaces, such as tribochemical reaction films (for example produced by ZDDP-containing lubricants) or polymeric and non-sacrificial reaction films (for example formed by complex esters).
