= Runningland =

Chinese laboratory company

Runningland Metrology & Testing Co., Ltd
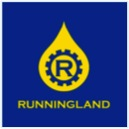
- Industry: Petroleum industry
- Founded: 2009; 17 years ago
- Headquarters: Shanghai, China, Shanghai, China
- Area served: China; Asia–Pacific; Worldwide
- Key people: David Zhou (Chairman); Ti Zhou (President)
- Website: Runningland.cn

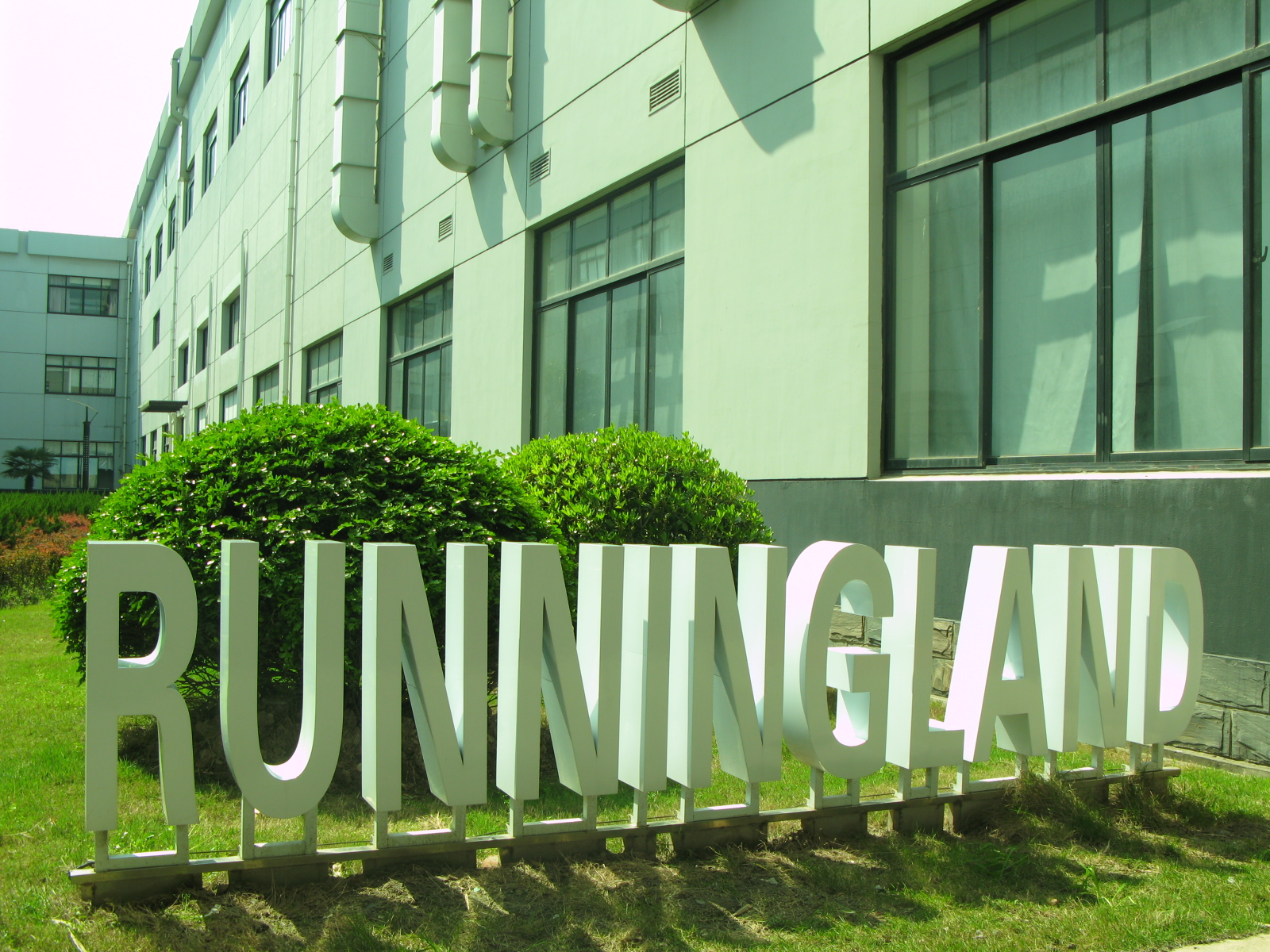
Runningland Shanghai Laboratory

Runningland Metrology & Testing Co., Ltd is a Shanghai-based accredited third party laboratory founded in 2009 that specializes in instruments metering, condition monitoring, calibration and testing petrochemical products. The company was founded by David Zhou, who is an active member of STLE (Society of Tribologists and Lubrication Engineers) ASTM D2 Committee, and SAE (Society of Automotive Engineers), and co-founded by Ti Zhou who is a member of Shanghai Lubrication Trade Association. As a commercial third party laboratory, the organization also collaborates with educational institutions and research associations across China. Oil analysis is still a relatively developing idea and has become an increasingly important concept in The People's Republic of China. Because the oil analysis market in China is growing, Runningland has developed a lab that specializes in grease testing. In 2015, STLE has published a report indicating its previous activities and plans to expand into the China market by organizing the China Advisory Council, which consists of 15 prominent members of China's lubrication industry including David Zhou, Chairman and Co-founder of Runningland.

== Annual cooperation with the Shanghai Lubricant Association ==
Runningland cooperates with the Shanghai Lubricant Association by providing training facilities and consultants. Annual training sessions and examination were held in 2010 and 2009 respectively in the area of Oil Analysis and Lubrication Analysis. Runningland's facilities have hosted training sessions for trainees, introducing them to newly improved testing methods revised annually by GB (Domestic), ASTM, ISO, and IP. The Shanghai Lubricant Association works closely with industry-related institutions and enterprises, making contributions to the development and progress of the Lubricant Industry in China.

== Laboratory accreditation ==
During 2010, Runningland Metrology & Testing (Shanghai) Company has been accredited with ISO/IEC 17025:2005 "General Requirements for Competence of Testing and Calibration Laboratories" (CNAS-CL01 "Testing and Calibration Laboratory Competence Accreditation Criteria"). Runningland was accredited by CNAS (China National Accreditation Service for Conformity Assessment) with registration No. CNAS L5287.

In order to demonstrate competence in carrying out specified testing, measurement and calibration, CNAS (China National Accreditation Committee) is the Standardization Administration of China. To ensure participation and meet international standards, 44 national bodies including the former China National Accreditation committee for Laboratories (now replaced by CNAS), signed a Memorandum of Understanding in September 1996. During 2000 and 2001, CNACL have signed the International Laboratory Accreditation Cooperation ILAC Mutual Recognition Arrangement and three years later, CNAL have signed ILAC-MRA. CNACL was later replaced by CNAS as China's National Accreditation committee and carries forth the MRA-ILAC signatory.

== Testing history ==
Since its founding in 2009, Runningland have been providing Oil Analytical Services, Equipment Lubrication, and Condition Monitoring to both multinational and domestic companies. Although a newly founded company, laboratory capabilities and testing equipment has grown extensively throughout the 2-3 year period. A vast majority of equipment used by the laboratory are purchased from European and US based companies such as Cannon Instruments, Metrohm, and Koehler Instrument Company, Inc. To determine testing strengths and weaknesses, Runningland has participated in worldwide inter-laboratory cross-check proficiency programs organized by ASTM and CNAS.

== Testing equipment ==
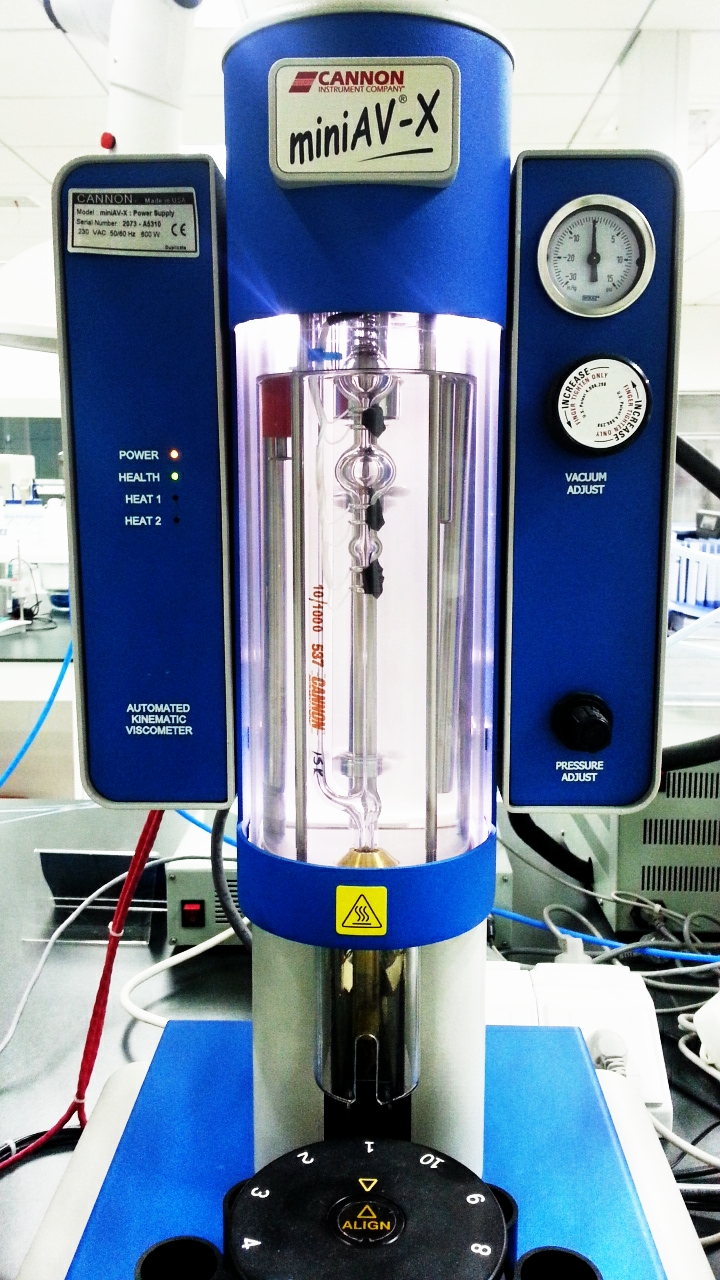
This is a Cannon Instruments miniAV-X Kinematic Viscometer operated by Runningland Metrology & Testing Co., in Shanghai.

Examples of Runningland's Testing and Analytical equipment inventory are as follows:

Micro Water Content Tester	Auto Flash Point Tester	CANNON Auto Viscometer	Mobile Testing Lab
Lube Oil Test Kit	Particle Counter	Four Ball Tester	CANNON HTHS
Ferrography	CANNON CCS	CANNON MRV	RULER
RBOT	FTIR	MPC	PQ

== Specific tests conducted ==
ASTM D445	ASTM D95	ASTM D6304	ASTM D92	ASTM D93	ASTM D3828
ASTM D2896	ASTM D4739	ASTM D664	ASTM D974	ASTM D5185	ASTM D6481
ASTM D4294	ASTM D97	ASTM D4530	ASTM D130	ASTM D1298	ASTM D4052
ASTM D482	ASTM D874	ASTM D893	ASTM D892	ASTM E2412	ASTM E1252
ASTM D1500	ASTM D2783	ASTM D4172	ASTM D2272	ASTM D5293	ASTM D5481
ASTM D3829	ASTM D4684	ASTM D4951	ASTM D6971	ASTM D611	ASTM D5800
ASTM D2983	ASTM D140	NAS 1638	SAE 4059	ISO 4406	ISO 440
ASTM D217	ASTM D1403	ASTM D2265	IP 396	ASTM D6184	ASTM D1831
ASTM D4048	ASTM D942	ASTM D86	ASTM D976	ASTM D4737	ASTM D6371
ASTM D1881	ASTM D1287	ASTM D1384	ASTM D1120	ASTM D1177	ASTM D1121
ASTM D943	ASTM D95	ASTM D97	ASTM D974	ASTM D976	ASTM E1252
ASTM E2412	IP 396	ISO 440	ISO 4406	NAS1638	SAE 4059
