= Harmen Blok =

Dutch mechanical engineer

- Born: 8 September 1910; Amsterdam
- Died: 16 August 2000 (aged 89); The Hague, Netherlands
- Education: Delft University of Technology
- Parent(s): Pieter Engel Johannes Blok and Wikje Harmina Poort
- Engineering career
- Discipline: Mechanical Engineering, Tribology
- Institutions: Delft University of Technology
- Employer: Royal Dutch Shell Group
- Significant advance: Prediction of flash temperature rise in rubbing contacts; Co-development of the four-ball wear tester
- Awards: Tribology Gold Medal (1973)

Harmen Blok was a Dutch mechanical engineer. He was best known for his work in the field of tribology.

== Early life and education ==
Blok was born on 8 September 1910 in Amsterdam. He was the son of Pieter Engel Johannes Blok and Wikje Harmina Poort.

He graduated with a degree in mechanical engineering from Delft University of Technology in 1932.

He died on 16 August 2000 in The Hague.

== Research ==
After graduating from the Delft University of Technology, and a short period as research assistant, Harmen Blok joined the Delft Laboratory of the Royal Dutch Shell Group in 1933, to work on the fundamentals of lubrication. He left Shell in 1951 to take up a position as Professor of Mechanical Engineering at Delft University of Technology. Here, along with Professor Boerlage, he developed the now ubiquitous four-ball wear tester. One of his key contributions was the prediction of flash temperature rise inside rubbing contacts. He also worked on thin-film fluid lubrication and gear tribology.

He was a Fellow of the American Society Mechanical Engineers and the Institution of Mechanical Engineers. In 1973, he was awarded the Tribology Gold Medal from the Institution of Mechanical Engineers.

He was a founding member of the International Tribology Council (ITC).
