= Tungsten disulfide =

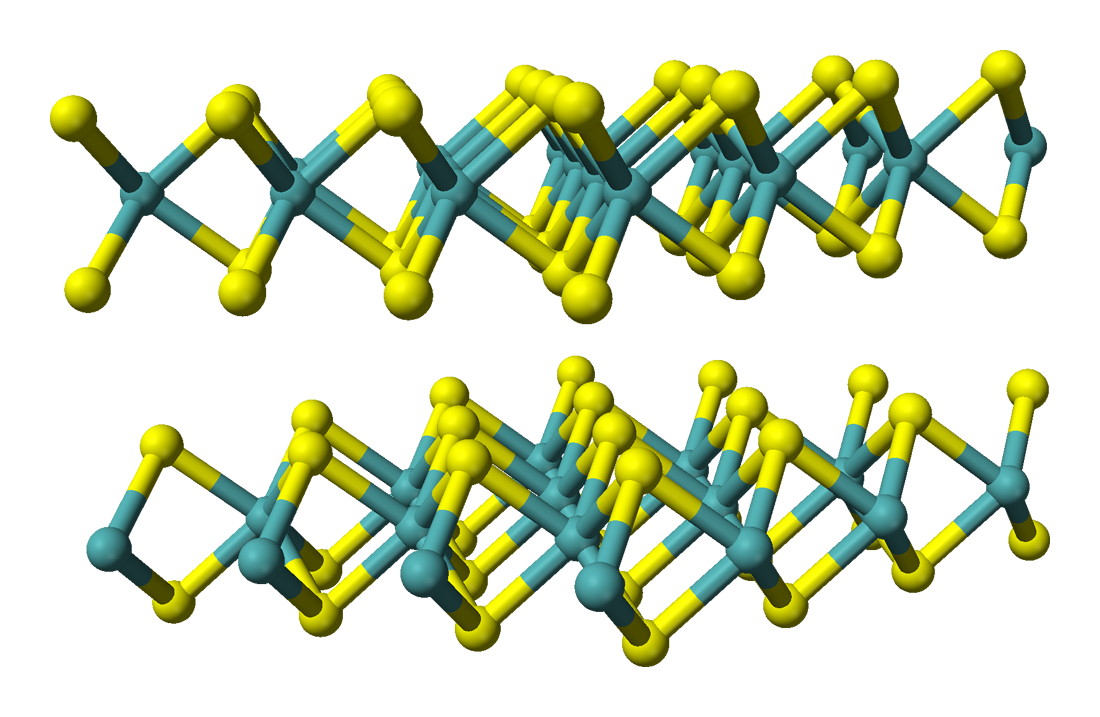

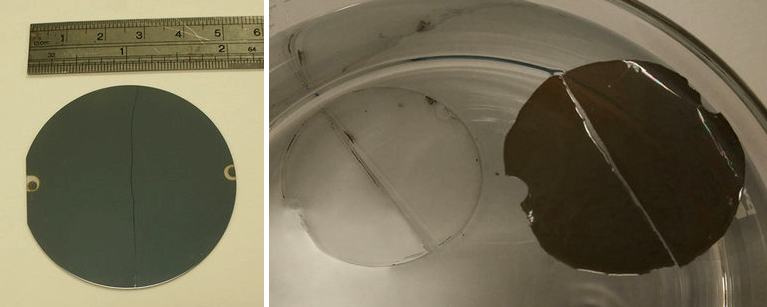
- Left: WS_{2} film on sapphire. Right: dark exfoliated WS_{2} film floating on water

Names
- IUPAC names Tungsten sulfur Bis(sulfanylidene)tungsten
- Systematic IUPAC name Dithioxotungsten
- Other names Tungsten(IV) sulfide Tungstenite

Identifiers
CAS Number	12138-09-9
3D model (JSmol)	Interactive image
ChEBI	CHEBI:30521
ChemSpider	74837
ECHA InfoCard	100.032.027
EC Number	235-243-3
PubChem CID	82938
UNII	6JHT6TE2T7
CompTox Dashboard (EPA)	DTXSID2065256
- InChI: InChI=1S/2S.W Key: ITRNXVSDJBHYNJ-UHFFFAOYSA-N; InChI=1S/2S.W Key: ITRNXVSDJBHYNJ-UHFFFAOYSA-N
- SMILES: S=[W]=S

Properties
Chemical formula	WS_{2}
Molar mass	247.98 g/mol
Appearance	Blue-gray powder
Density	7.5 g/cm^{3}, solid
Melting point	1,250 °C (2,280 °F; 1,520 K) decomposes
Solubility in water	Slightly soluble
Band gap	~1.35 eV (optical, indirect, bulk); ~2.05 eV (optical, direct, monolayer)
Magnetic susceptibility (χ)	+5850·10^{−6} cm^{3}/mol

Structure
Crystal structure	Molybdenite
Coordination geometry	Trigonal prismatic (W^{IV}); Pyramidal (S^{2−})

Related compounds
Other anions	Tungsten(IV) oxide Tungsten diselenide Tungsten ditelluride
Other cations	Molybdenum disulfide Tantalum disulfide Rhenium disulfide
- Except where otherwise noted, data are given for materials in their standard state (at 25 °C [77 °F], 100 kPa). verify (what is ?) Infobox references

Tungsten disulfide is an inorganic chemical compound composed of tungsten and sulfur with the chemical formula WS_{2}. This compound is part of the group of materials called the transition metal dichalcogenides. It occurs naturally as the rare mineral tungstenite. This material is a component of certain catalysts used for hydrodesulfurization and hydrodenitrification.

WS_{2} adopts a layered structure similar, or isotypic with MoS_{2}, instead with W atoms situated in trigonal prismatic coordination sphere (in place of Mo atoms). Owing to this layered structure, WS_{2} forms non-carbon nanotubes, which were discovered after heating a thin sample of WS_{2} in 1992.

== Structure and physical properties ==
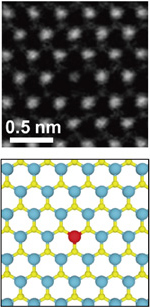
Atomic image (top) and model (bottom) of Nb-doped WS_{2}. Blue, red, and yellow spheres indicate W, Nb, and S atoms, respectively. Nb doping allows to reduce the WS_{2} bandgap.

Bulk WS_{2} forms dark gray hexagonal crystals with a layered structure. Like the closely related MoS_{2}, it exhibits properties of a dry lubricant.

Although it has long been thought that WS_{2} is relatively stable in ambient air, recent reports on the ambient air oxidation of monolayer WS_{2} have found this to not be the case. In the monolayer form, WS_{2} is converted rather rapidly (over the course of days in ambient light and atmosphere) to tungsten oxide via a photo-oxidation reaction involving visible wavelengths of light readily absorbed by monolayer WS_{2} (< ~660 nm; > ~1.88 eV). In addition to light of suitable wavelength, the reaction likely requires both oxygen and water to proceed, with the water thought to act as a catalyst for oxidation. The products of the reaction likely include various tungsten oxide species and sulfuric acid. The oxidation of other semiconductor transition metal dichalcogenides (S-TMDs) such as MoS_{2}, has similarly been observed to occur in ambient light and atmospheric conditions.

WS_{2} is also attacked by a mixture of nitric and hydrofluoric acid. When heated in oxygen-containing atmosphere, WS_{2} converts to tungsten trioxide. When heated in absence of oxygen, WS_{2} does not melt but decomposes to tungsten and sulfur, but only at 1250 °C.

Historically monolayer WS_{2} was isolated using chemical exfoliation via intercalation with lithium from n-butyl lithium (in hexane), followed by exfoliation of the Li intercalated compound by sonication in water. WS_{2} also undergoes exfoliation by treatment with various reagents such as chlorosulfonic acid and the lithium halides.

== Synthesis ==
WS_{2} is produced by a number of methods. Many of these methods involve treating oxides with sources of sulfide or hydrosulfide, supplied as hydrogen sulfide or generated in situ.

=== Thin films and monolayers ===
Widely used techniques for the growth of monolayer WS_{2} include

- chemical vapor deposition (CVD)
- physical vapor deposition (PVD)
- metal organic chemical vapor deposition (MOCVD)

Though most current methods produce sulfur vacancy defects in excess of 1×10^{13} cm^{−2}.

Other routes entail thermolysis of tungsten(VI) sulfides (e.g., (R_{4}N)_{2}WS_{4}) or the equivalent (e.g., WS_{3}).

Freestanding WS_{2} films can be produced as follows: WS_{2} is deposited on a hydrophilic substrate, such as sapphire, and then coated with a polymer, such as polystyrene. After dipping the sample in water for a few minutes, the hydrophobic WS_{2} film spontaneously peels off.

== Applications ==
WS_{2} is used, in conjunction with other materials, as catalyst for hydrotreating of crude oil. In recent years it has also found applications as a saturable for passively mode locked fibre lasers resulting in femtosecond pulses being produced.

Lamellar tungsten disulphide is used as a dry lubricant for fasteners, bearings, and molds, as well as having significant use in aerospace and military industries., which have extremely low coefficient of friction of 0.03.

WS_{2} can be applied to a metal surface without binders or curing, via high-velocity air impingement. The most recent official standard for this process is laid out in the SAE International specification AMS2530B.

== Research ==
Like MoS_{2}, nanostructured WS_{2} is actively studied for potential applications, such as storage of hydrogen and lithium. WS_{2} also catalyses hydrogenation of carbon dioxide:

CO_{2} + H_{2} → CO + H_{2}O

=== Nanotubes ===
Tungsten disulfide is the first material which was found to form non-carbon nanotubes, in 1992. This ability is related to the layered structure of WS_{2}, and macroscopic amounts of WS_{2} have been produced by the methods mentioned above. WS_{2} nanotubes have been investigated as reinforcing agents to improve the mechanical properties of polymeric nanocomposites. In a study, WS_{2} nanotubes reinforced biodegradable polymeric nanocomposites of polypropylene fumarate (PPF) showed significant increases in the Young's modulus, compression yield strength, flexural modulus and flexural yield strength, compared to single- and multi-walled carbon nanotubes reinforced PPF nanocomposites, suggesting that WS_{2} nanotubes may be better reinforcing agents than carbon nanotubes. The addition of WS_{2} nanotubes to epoxy resin improved adhesion, fracture toughness and strain energy release rate. The wear of the nanotubes-reinforced epoxy is lower than that of pure epoxy. WS_{2} nanotubes were embedded into a poly(methyl methacrylate) (PMMA) nanofiber matrix via electrospinning. The nanotubes were well dispersed and aligned along fiber axis. The enhanced stiffness and toughness of PMMA fiber meshes by means of non-carbon nanotubes addition may have potential uses as impact-absorbing materials, e.g. for ballistic vests.

WS_{2} nanotubes are hollow and can be filled with another material, to preserve or guide it to a desired location, or to generate new properties in the filler material which is confined within a nanometer-scale diameter. To this goal, non-carbon nanotube hybrids were made by filling WS_{2} nanotubes with molten lead, antimony or bismuth iodide salt by a capillary wetting process, resulting in PbI_{2}@WS_{2}, SbI_{3}@WS_{2} or BiI_{3}@WS_{2} core–shell nanotubes.

=== Nanosheets ===
WS_{2} can also exist in the form of atomically thin sheets. Such materials exhibit room-temperature photoluminescence in the monolayer limit.

=== Transistors ===
Taiwan Semiconductor Manufacturing Company (TSMC) as of 2019 is investigating use of WS_{2} as a channel material in field effect transistors. The approximately 6-layer thick material is created using chemical vapor deposition (CVD).
