= Dry lubricant =

Solid substance used as a lubricant

Dry lubricants or solid lubricants are materials that, despite being in the solid phase, are able to reduce friction between two surfaces sliding against each other without the need for a liquid oil medium.

The two main dry lubricants are graphite and molybdenum disulfide. They offer lubrication at temperatures higher than liquid and oil-based lubricants operate. Dry lubricants are often used in applications such as locks or dry lubricated bearings. Such materials can operate up to 350 °C (662 °F) in oxidizing environments and even higher in reducing / non-oxidizing environments (molybdenum disulfide up to 1100 °C, 2012 °F). The low-friction characteristics of most dry lubricants are attributed to a layered structure on the molecular level with weak bonding between layers. Such layers are able to slide relative to each other with minimal applied force, thus giving them their low friction properties.

However, a layered crystal structure alone is not necessarily sufficient for lubrication. In fact, there are some solids with non-lamellar structures that function well as dry lubricants in some applications. These include certain soft metals (indium, lead, silver, tin), polytetrafluroethylene, some solid oxides, rare-earth fluorides, and even diamond.

Limited interest has been shown in low friction properties of compacted oxide glaze layers formed at several hundred degrees Celsius in metallic sliding systems. However, practical use is still many years away due to their physically unstable nature.

The four most commonly used solid lubricants are:

1. Graphite. Used in air compressors, food industry, railway track joints, brass instrument valves, piano actions, open gear, ball bearings, machine-shop works, etc. It is also very common for lubricating locks, since a liquid lubricant allows particles to get stuck in the lock worsening the problem. It is often used to lubricate the internal moving parts of firearms in sandy environments.
2. Molybdenum disulfide (MoS_{2}). Used in CV joints and space vehicles. Does lubricate in vacuum.
3. Hexagonal boron nitride. Uses as high-temperature lubricants and mold release agents. Used in space vehicles. Also called "white graphite".
4. Tungsten disulfide. Similar usage as molybdenum disulfide, but due to the high cost only found in some dry lubricated bearings.

Graphite and molybdenum disulfide are the predominant materials used as dry lubricants.

== Structure-function relationship ==
The lubricity of many solids is attributable to a lamellar structure. The lamellae orient parallel to the surface in the direction of motion and slide easily over each other resulting in low friction and preventing contact between sliding components even under high loads. Large particles perform best on rough surfaces at low speed, finer particles on smoother surfaces and at higher speeds. These materials may be added in the form of dry powder to liquid lubricants to modify or enhance their properties.

Other components that are useful solid lubricants include boron nitride, polytetrafluorethylene (PTFE), talc, calcium fluoride, cerium fluoride, and tungsten disulfide.

== Applications ==
Solid lubricants are useful for conditions when conventional lubricants are inadequate, such as:

- Reciprocating motion. A typical application is a sliding or reciprocating motion that requires lubrication to minimize wear, as, for example, in gear and chain lubrication. Liquid lubricants will squeeze out while solid lubricants do not escape, preventing fretting, corrosion, and galling.
- Ceramics. Another application is for cases where chemically active lubricant additives have not been found for a particular surface, such as polymers and ceramics.
- High temperature. Graphite and MoS_{2} act as lubricants at high temperature and in oxidizing atmosphere environments, where liquid lubricants typically will not survive. A typical application involves fasteners that are easily tightened and unscrewed after a long stay at high temperatures.
- Extreme contact pressures. The lamellar structure orients parallel to the sliding surface, resulting in high bearing-load combined with a low shear stress. Most applications in metal forming that involve plastic deformation use solid lubricants.

=== Graphite ===
Graphite is structurally composed of planes of polycyclic carbon atoms that are hexagonal in orientation. The distance of carbon atoms between planes is longer and, therefore, the bonding is weaker.

Graphite is best suited for lubrication in air. Water vapor is a necessary component for graphite lubrication. The adsorption of water reduces the bonding energy between the hexagonal planes of the graphite to a lower level than the adhesion energy between a substrate and the graphite. Because water vapor is a requirement for lubrication, graphite is not effective in vacuum. Because it is electrically conductive, graphite can promote galvanic corrosion. In an oxidative atmosphere, graphite is effective at high temperatures up to 450 °C continuously and can withstand much higher temperature peaks.

Graphite is characterized by two main groups: natural and synthetic.

- Synthetic graphite is a high temperature sintered product and is characterized by its high purity of carbon (99.5–99.9%). Primary grade synthetic graphite can approach the good lubricity of quality natural graphite.
- Natural graphite is derived from mining. The quality of natural graphite varies as a result of the ore quality and its post-mining processing. The end product is graphite with a content of carbon (high grade graphite 96–98% carbon), sulfur, SiO_{2}, and ash. The higher the carbon content and the degree of graphitization (high crystalline) the better the lubricity and resistance to oxidation.

For applications where only a minor lubricity is needed and a more thermally insulating coating is required, then amorphous graphite would be chosen (80% carbon).

=== Molybdenum disulfide ===
MoS_{2} is mined from some sulfide-rich deposits and refined to achieve a purity suitable for lubricants. Like graphite, MoS_{2} has a hexagonal crystal structure with the intrinsic property of easy shear. MoS_{2} lubrication performance often exceeds that of graphite and is effective in vacuum as well, whereas graphite is not. The temperature limitation of MoS_{2} at 400 °C is restricted by oxidation. Particle size and film thickness are important parameters that should be matched to the surface roughness of the substrate. Large particles may result in excessive wear by abrasion caused by impurities in the MoS_{2}, and small particles may result in accelerated oxidation.

=== Boron nitride ===
Hexagonal boron nitride is a ceramic powder lubricant. The most interesting lubricant feature is its high temperature resistance of 1200 °C service temperature in an oxidizing atmosphere. Furthermore, boron nitride has a high thermal conductivity. (Cubic boron nitride is very hard and used as an abrasive and cutting tool component.)

=== Polytetrafluorethylene ===
Polytetrafluorethylene (PTFE) is widely used as an additive in lubricating oils and greases. Due to the low surface energy of PTFE, stable unflocculated dispersions of PTFE in oil or water can be produced. Contrary to the other solid lubricants discussed, PTFE does not have a layered structure. The macro molecules of PTFE slip easily along each other, similar to lamellar structures. PTFE shows one of the smallest coefficients of static and dynamic friction, down to 0.04. Operating temperatures are limited to about 260 °C.

== Application methods ==
=== Spraying/dipping/brushing ===
Dispersion of solid lubricant as an additive in oil, water, or grease is most commonly used. For parts that are inaccessible for lubrication after assembly, a dry film lubricant can be sprayed. After the solvent evaporates, the coating cures at room temperature to form a solid lubricant. Pastes are grease-like lubricants containing a high percentage of solid lubricants used for assembly and lubrication of highly loaded, slow-moving parts. Black pastes generally contain MoS_{2}. Some high-temperature anti-seize pastes contain copper particles dispersed in petroleum grease and are used on threaded assemblies to reduce seizing and galling and facilitate disassembly.

Some tungsten disulfide (WS₂) dry-film coatings are applied by propelling the powder onto a substrate with dry compressed air. This process can be carried out at room temperature without a binder.

=== Free powders ===
Solid lubricant powders can be rubbed or burnished onto a roughened metal surface to form a lubricating film. Burnished molybdenum disulfide films are relatively simple and inexpensive to apply, but their wear life is limited compared with resin-bonded coatings.

=== Anti-friction coatings ===
Anti-friction (AF) coatings are "lubricating paints" consisting of fine particles of lubricating pigments, such as molydisulfide, PTFE or graphite, blended with a binder. After application and proper curing, these "slippery" or dry lubricants bond to the metal surface and form a dark gray solid film. Many dry film lubricants contain special rust inhibitors which offer exceptional corrosion protection. Most long-wearing films are of the bonded type but are still restricted to applications where sliding distances are not too long. AF coatings are applied where fretting and galling is a problem (such as splines, universal joints and keyed bearings), where operating pressures exceed the load-bearing capacities of ordinary oils and greases, where smooth running in is desired (piston, camshaft), where clean operation is desired (AF coatings will not collect dirt and debris like greases and oils), and where parts may be stored for long periods.

=== Composites ===
Self-lubricating composites combine a matrix that provides structural strength with a solid lubricant that provides lubrication. Polymers used in bearing materials include nylon, acetal, polyethylene and PTFE. Solid lubricant fillers such as graphite and molybdenum disulfide can improve friction and wear behavior, but may reduce mechanical strength and load-carrying capacity. Fiber reinforcement can be used where greater load capacity is required.
