= Mayo D. Hersey =

American engineer and physicist

Mayo Dyer Hersey (August 30, 1886 – September 5, 1978) was an American engineer, physicist at the National Bureau of Standards and other government agencies, and Professor of Engineering at Brown University. He received the 1957 ASME Medal, and the first Mayo D. Hersey award in 1965.

== Biography ==
=== Youth, education and early career ===
Hersey was born in Pawtuxet Neck in Providence County, Rhode Island, in 1886, son of George Milbank Hersey and Alice Stafford (Budlong) Hersey. He obtained his Bsc from Colorado College in 1907, and in 1910 both his BSc in mechanical engineering from Massachusetts Institute of Technology, and his MSc in physics and mathematics from Olivet College.

After his graduation in 1910 Hersey started his career as physicist at the National Bureau of Standards, now National Institute of Standards and Technology. He also started teaching at the Massachusetts Institute of Technology from 1910 to 1922. In World War I he did research on aeronautical instruments for the National Bureau of Standards.

=== Further career and acknowledgement ===
After leaving the National Bureau of Standards in 1920, Hersey was appointed at the U.S. Bureau of Mines in Pittsburgh as chief of the physical laboratory from 1922 to 1926. From 1936 to 1951 Hersey was back at the National Bureau of Standards. In World War II he served as a consultant to the Manhattan Project at Columbia. From 1947 to 1957 he also worked as scholar for the Naval Engineering Experiment Station at Annapolis, and then retired from government service.

From 1934 to 1936 Hersey had lectured at Brown University, and from 1943 to 1945 he had been a scholar at Columbia University. From 1957 until his death in 1978 he had been visiting professor in engineering at Brown University.

He received the Society of Tribologists and Lubrication Engineers International Award in 1951. In 1965 the ASME initiated the annual Mayo D. Hersey award for "distinguished and continued contributions over a substantial period of time to the advancement of the science and engineering of tribology," and Hersey was named its first recipient. In 1967 the ASME also awarded him the ASME Medal. In 1974, the Institution of Mechanical Engineers awarded him the Tribology Gold Medal.

== Selected publications ==
- Mayo Dyer Hersey. On the Laws of Lubrication of Journal Bearings, 1915.
- Mayo Dyer Hersey. Theory of lubrication, J. Wiley & Sons, inc., 1938.
- Mayo Dyer Hersey and Richard F. Hopkins. Viscosity of lubricants under pressure. American Society of Mechanical Engineers, 1954.
- Mayo Dyer Hersey Theory and research in lubrication : foundations for future developments, John Wiley & Sons, 1966.

Articles, a selection

- Hersey, Mayo D. "The laws of lubrication of horizontal journal bearings." Journal of the Washington Academy of Sciences 4.19 (1914): 542-552.
- Hersey, Mayo D. "Future problems of theoretical rheology." Journal of Rheology (1929-1932) 3.2 (1932): 196-204.
- Hersey, Mayo D. "Note on heat effects in capillary flow." Physics 7.11 (1936): 403-407.
