= Molybdenum disulfide =

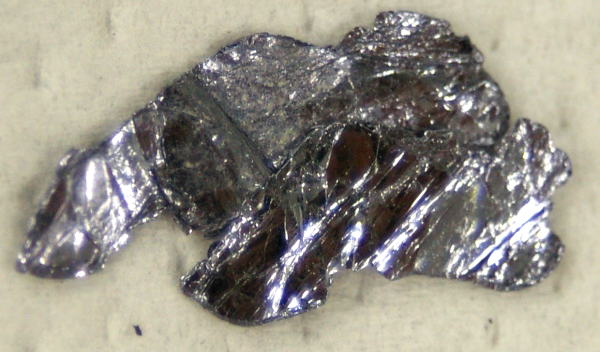
- Molybdenum disulfide

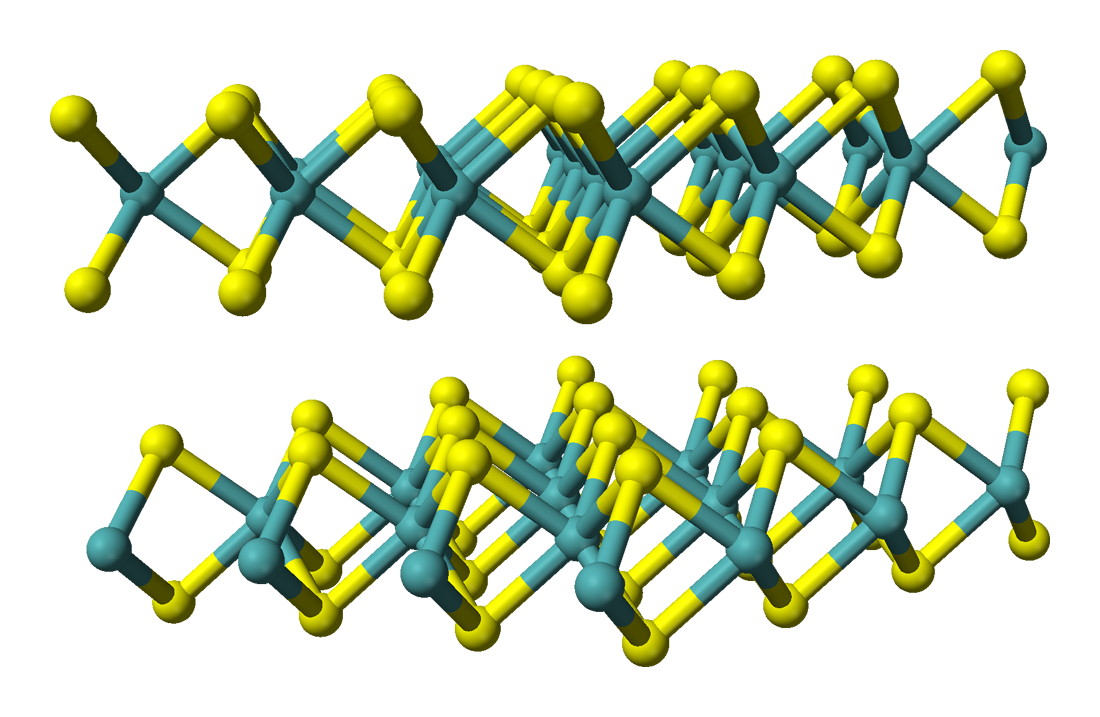

Names
- IUPAC name Molybdenum disulfide
- Other names Molybdenum(IV) sulfide

Identifiers
CAS Number	1317-33-5
3D model (JSmol)	Interactive image
ChEBI	CHEBI:30704
ChemSpider	14138
ECHA InfoCard	100.013.877
PubChem CID	14823
RTECS number	QA4697000
UNII	ZC8B4P503V
CompTox Dashboard (EPA)	DTXSID201318098 DTXSID5042162, DTXSID201318098
- InChI: InChI=1S/Mo.2S Key: CWQXQMHSOZUFJS-UHFFFAOYSA-N; InChI=1/Mo.2S/rMoS2/c2-1-3 Key: CWQXQMHSOZUFJS-FRBXWHJUAU
- SMILES: S=[Mo]=S

Properties
Chemical formula	MoS_{2}
Molar mass	160.07 g·mol^{−1}
Appearance	black/lead-gray solid
Density	5.06 g/cm^{3}
Melting point	2,375 °C (4,307 °F; 2,648 K)
Solubility in water	insoluble
Solubility	decomposed by aqua regia, hot sulfuric acid, nitric acid insoluble in dilute acids
Band gap	1.23 eV (indirect, 3R or 2H bulk); ~1.8 eV (direct, monolayer)

Structure
Crystal structure	hP6, P6_{3}/mmc, No. 194 (2H) hR9, R3m, No 160 (3R)
Lattice constant	a = 0.3161 nm (2H), 0.3163 nm (3R), c = 1.2295 nm (2H), 1.837 (3R)
Coordination geometry	Trigonal prismatic (Mo^{IV}); Pyramidal (S^{2−})

Thermochemistry
Std molar entropy (S^{⦵}_{298})	62.63 J/(mol·K)
Std enthalpy of formation (Δ_{f}H^{⦵}_{298})	−235.10 kJ/mol
Gibbs free energy (Δ_{f}G^{⦵})	−225.89 kJ/mol

Hazards
Safety data sheet (SDS)	External MSDS

Related compounds
Other anions	Molybdenum(IV) oxide Molybdenum diselenide Molybdenum ditelluride
Other cations	Tungsten disulfide
Related lubricants	Graphite
- Except where otherwise noted, data are given for materials in their standard state (at 25 °C [77 °F], 100 kPa). verify (what is ?) Infobox references

Molybdenum disulfide (or moly) is an inorganic compound composed of molybdenum and sulfur. Its chemical formula is MoS_{2}.

The compound is classified as a transition metal dichalcogenide. It is a silvery black solid that occurs as the mineral molybdenite, the principal ore for molybdenum. MoS_{2} is relatively unreactive. It is unaffected by dilute acids and oxygen. In appearance and feel, molybdenum disulfide is similar to graphite. It is widely used as a dry lubricant because of its low friction and robustness. Bulk MoS_{2} is a diamagnetic, indirect bandgap semiconductor similar to silicon, with a bandgap of 1.23 eV.

== Production ==
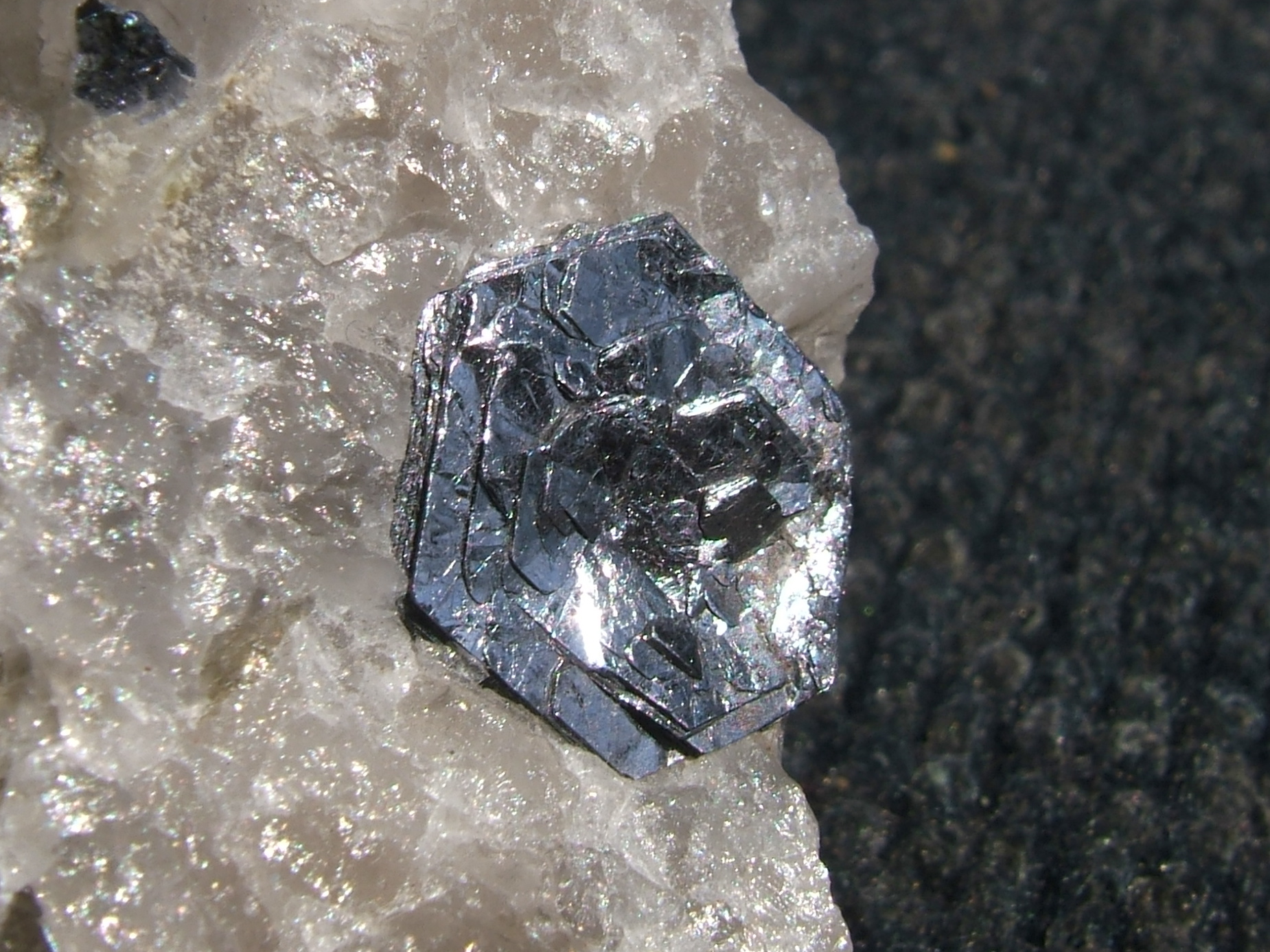
Molybdenite

MoS_{2} is naturally found as either molybdenite, a crystalline mineral, or jordisite, a rare low temperature form of molybdenite. Molybdenite ore is processed by flotation to give relatively pure MoS_{2}. The main contaminant is carbon. MoS_{2} also arises by thermal treatment of virtually all molybdenum compounds with hydrogen sulfide or elemental sulfur and can be produced by metathesis reactions from molybdenum pentachloride.

== Structure and physical properties ==
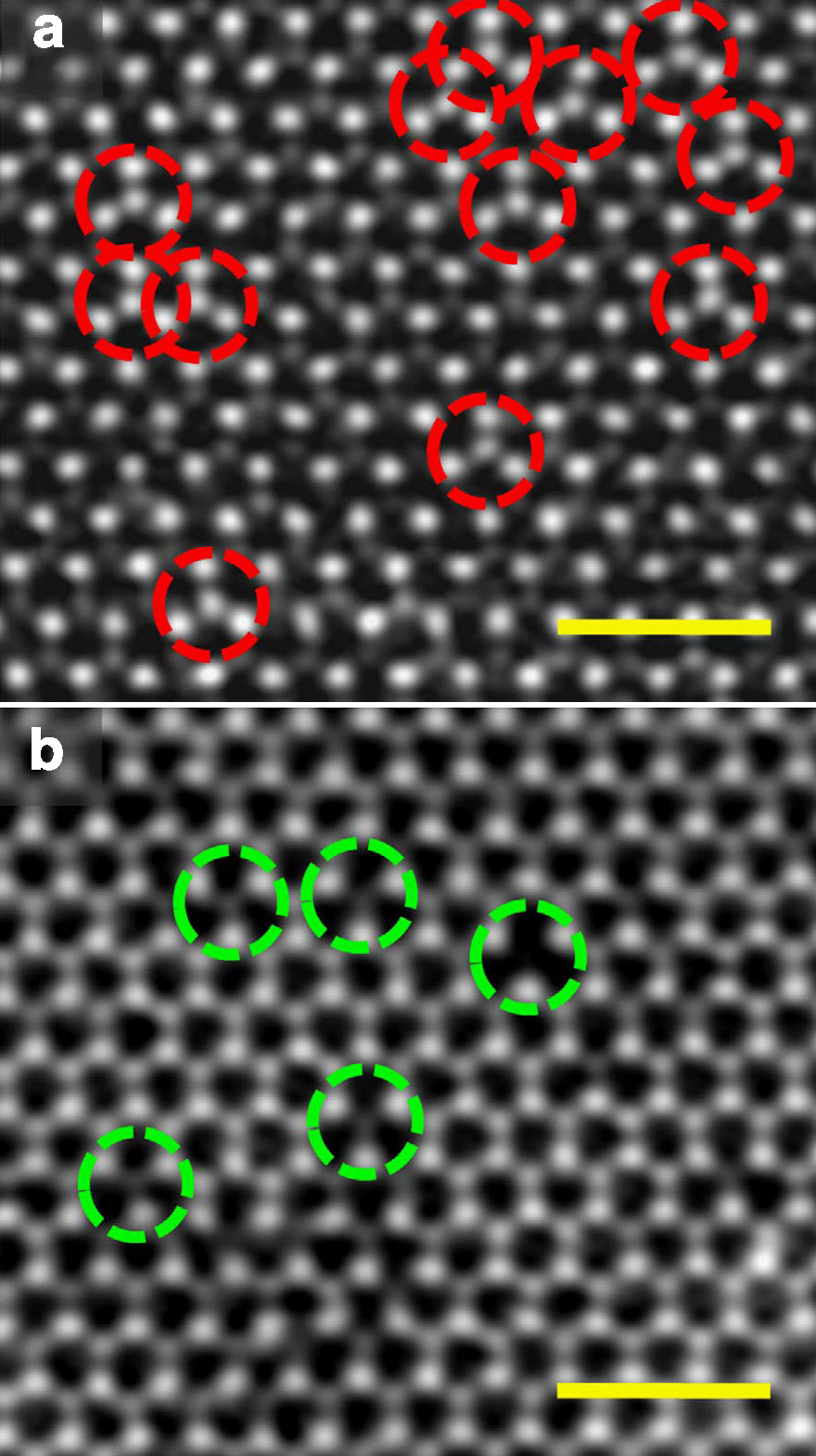
Electron microscopy of antisites (a, Mo substitutes for S) and vacancies (b, missing S atoms) in a monolayer of molybdenum disulfide. Scale bar: 1 nm.

=== Crystalline phases ===
All forms of MoS_{2} have a layered structure, in which a plane of molybdenum atoms is sandwiched by planes of sulfide ions. These three strata form a monolayer of MoS_{2}. Bulk MoS_{2} consists of stacked monolayers, which are held together by weak van der Waals interactions.

Crystalline MoS_{2} exists in one of two phases, 2H-MoS_{2} and 3R-MoS_{2}, where the "H" and the "R" indicate hexagonal and rhombohedral symmetry, respectively. In both of these structures, each molybdenum atom exists at the center of a trigonal prismatic coordination sphere and is covalently bonded to six sulfide ions. Each sulfur atom has pyramidal coordination and is bonded to three molybdenum atoms. Both the 2H- and 3R-phases are semiconducting.

A third, metastable crystalline phase known as 1T-MoS_{2} was discovered by intercalating 2H-MoS_{2} with alkali metals. This phase has trigonal symmetry and is metallic. The 1T-phase can be stabilized through doping with electron donors such as rhenium, or converted back to the 2H-phase by microwave radiation. The 2H/1T-phase transition can be controlled via the incorporation of sulfur (S) vacancies.

=== Allotropes ===
Nanotube-like and buckyball-like molecules composed of MoS_{2} are known.

=== Exfoliated MoS_{2} flakes ===
While bulk MoS_{2} in the 2H-phase is known to be an indirect-band gap semiconductor, monolayer MoS_{2} has a direct band gap. The layer-dependent optoelectronic properties of MoS_{2} have promoted much research in 2-dimensional MoS_{2}-based devices. 2D MoS_{2} can be produced by exfoliating bulk crystals to produce single-layer to few-layer flakes either through a dry, micromechanical process or through solution processing.

Micromechanical exfoliation, also pragmatically called "Scotch-tape exfoliation", involves using an adhesive material to repeatedly peel apart a layered crystal by overcoming the van der Waals forces. The crystal flakes can then be transferred from the adhesive film to a substrate. This facile method was first used by Konstantin Novoselov and Andre Geim to obtain graphene from graphite crystals. However, it can not be employed for a uniform 1-D layers because of weaker adhesion of MoS_{2} to the substrate (either silicon, glass or quartz); the aforementioned scheme is good for graphene only. While Scotch tape is generally used as the adhesive tape, PDMS stamps can also satisfactorily cleave MoS_{2} if it is important to avoid contaminating the flakes with residual adhesive.

Liquid-phase exfoliation can also be used to produce monolayer to multi-layer MoS_{2} in solution. A few methods include lithium intercalation to delaminate the layers and sonication in a high-surface tension solvent.

=== Mechanical properties ===
MoS_{2} excels as a lubricating material (see below) due to its layered structure and low coefficient of friction. Interlayer sliding dissipates energy when a shear stress is applied to the material. Extensive work has been performed to characterize the coefficient of friction and shear strength of MoS_{2} in various atmospheres. The shear strength of MoS_{2} increases as the coefficient of friction increases. This property is called superlubricity. At ambient conditions, the coefficient of friction for MoS_{2} was determined to be 0.150, with a corresponding estimated shear strength of 56.0 MPa. Direct methods of measuring the shear strength indicate that the value is closer to 25.3 MPa.

The wear resistance of MoS_{2} in lubricating applications can be increased by doping MoS_{2} with Cr. Microindentation experiments on nanopillars of Cr-doped MoS_{2} found that the yield strength increased from an average of 821 MPa for pure MoS_{2} (at 0% Cr) to 1017 MPa at 50% Cr. The increase in yield strength is accompanied by a change in the failure mode of the material. While the pure MoS_{2} nanopillar fails through a plastic bending mechanism, brittle fracture modes become apparent as the material is loaded with increasing amounts of dopant.

The widely used method of micromechanical exfoliation has been carefully studied in MoS_{2} to understand the mechanism of delamination in few-layer to multi-layer flakes. The exact mechanism of cleavage was found to be layer dependent. Flakes thinner than 5 layers undergo homogenous bending and rippling, while flakes around 10 layers thick delaminated through interlayer sliding. Flakes with more than 20 layers exhibited a kinking mechanism during micromechanical cleavage. The cleavage of these flakes was also determined to be reversible due to the nature of van der Waals bonding.

In recent years, MoS_{2} has been utilized in flexible electronic applications, promoting more investigation into the elastic properties of this material. Nanoscopic bending tests using AFM cantilever tips were performed on micromechanically exfoliated MoS_{2} flakes that were deposited on a holey substrate. The Young's modulus of monolayer flakes was 270 GPa, while the thicker flakes were stiffer, with a Young's modulus of 330 GPa. Molecular dynamic simulations found the in-plane Young's modulus of MoS_{2} to be 229 GPa, which matches the experimental results within error.

Bertolazzi and coworkers also characterized the failure modes of the suspended monolayer flakes. The strain at failure ranges from 6 to 11%. The average yield strength of monolayer MoS_{2} is 23 GPa, which is close to the theoretical fracture strength for defect-free MoS_{2}.

The band structure of MoS_{2} is sensitive to strain.

== Chemical reactions ==
Molybdenum disulfide is stable in air and attacked only by aggressive reagents. It reacts with oxygen upon heating forming molybdenum trioxide:

2 MoS_{2} + 7 O_{2} → 2 MoO_{3} + 4 SO_{2}

Chlorine attacks molybdenum disulfide at elevated temperatures to form molybdenum pentachloride:

2 MoS_{2} + 7 Cl_{2} → 2 MoCl_{5} + 2 S_{2}Cl_{2}

=== Intercalation reactions ===
Molybdenum disulfide is a host for formation of intercalation compounds. This behavior is relevant to its use as a cathode material in batteries. One example is a lithiated material, Li_{x}MoS_{2}. With butyl lithium, the product is LiMoS_{2}.

== Applications ==
=== Lubricant ===
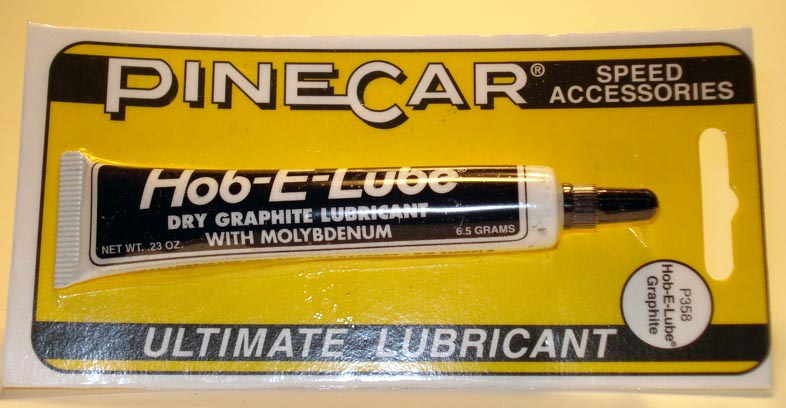
A tube of commercial graphite powder lubricant with molybdenum disulfide additive (called "molybdenum")

Due to weak van der Waals interactions between the sheets of sulfide atoms, MoS_{2} has a low coefficient of friction. MoS_{2} in particle sizes in the range of 1–100 μm is a common dry lubricant. Few alternatives exist that confer high lubricity and stability at up to 350 °C in oxidizing environments. Sliding friction tests of MoS_{2} using a pin on disc tester at low loads (0.1–2 N) give friction coefficient values of <0.1.

MoS_{2} is often a component of blends and composites that require low friction. For example, it is added to graphite to improve sticking. A variety of oils and greases use MoS_{2}, because they retain their lubricity even in cases of almost complete oil loss, thus finding a use in critical applications such as aircraft engines. When added to plastics, MoS_{2} forms a composite with improved strength as well as reduced friction. Polymers that may be filled with MoS_{2} include nylon (trade name Nylatron), Teflon and Vespel. Self-lubricating composite coatings for high-temperature applications consist of molybdenum disulfide and titanium nitride, using chemical vapor deposition.

Examples of applications of MoS_{2}-based lubricants include two-stroke engines (such as motorcycle engines), bicycle coaster brakes, automotive CV and universal joints, ski waxes and bullets.

Other layered inorganic materials that exhibit lubricating properties (collectively known as solid lubricants (or dry lubricants)) includes graphite, which requires volatile additives and hexagonal boron nitride.

=== Catalysis ===
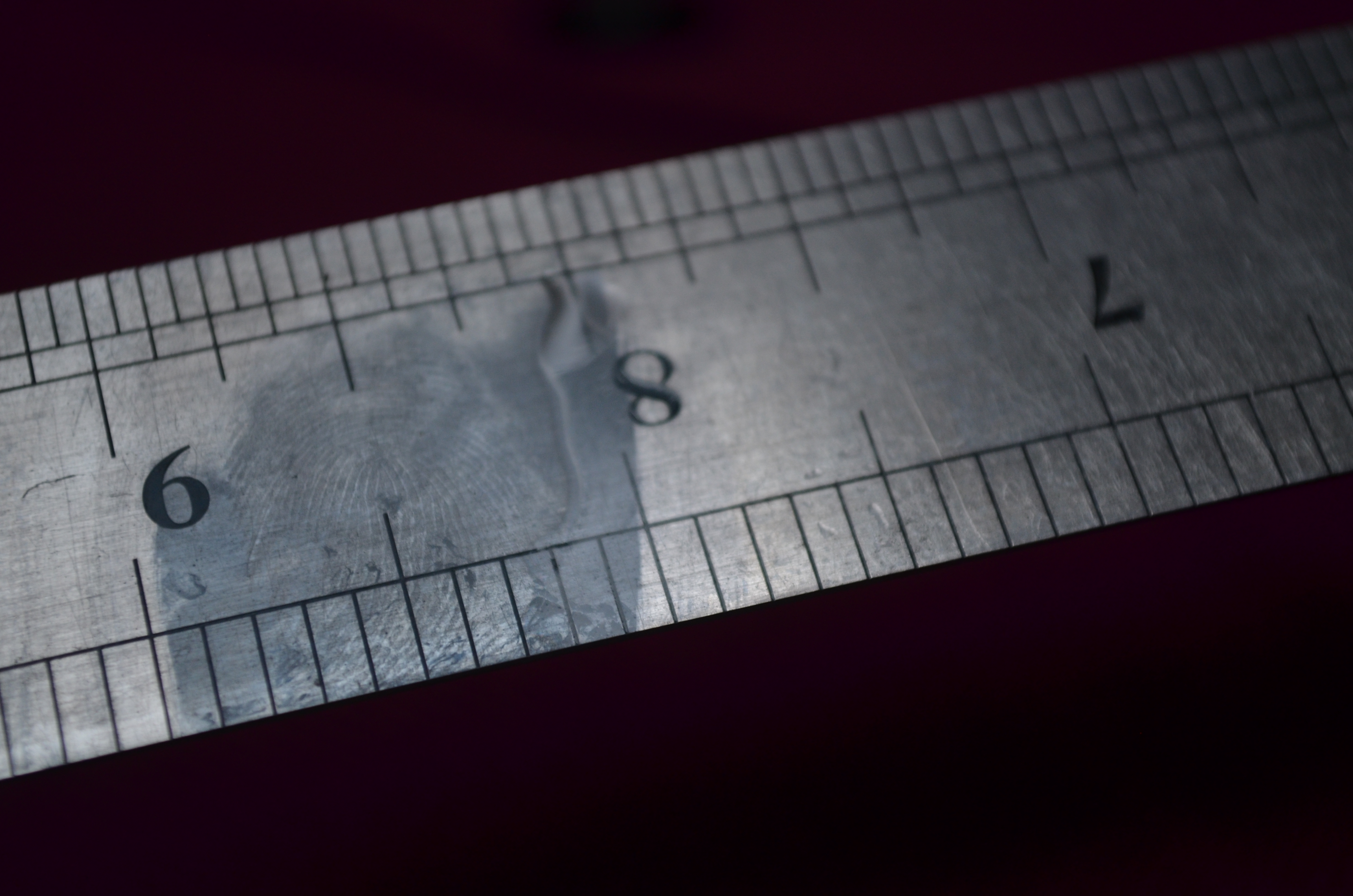
Fingerprint revealed by molybdenum disulfide

MoS_{2} is employed as a cocatalyst for desulfurization in petrochemistry, for example, hydrodesulfurization. The effectiveness of the MoS_{2} catalysts is enhanced by doping with small amounts of cobalt or nickel. The intimate mixture of these sulfides is supported on alumina. Such catalysts are generated in situ by treating molybdate/cobalt or nickel-impregnated alumina with H_{2}S or an equivalent reagent. Catalysis does not occur at the regular sheet-like regions of the crystallites, but instead at the edge of these planes.

MoS_{2} finds use as a hydrogenation catalyst for organic synthesis. As it is derived from a common transition metal, rather than a group 10 metal, MoS_{2} is chosen when price or resistance to sulfur poisoning are of primary concern. MoS_{2} is effective for the hydrogenation of nitro compounds to amines and can be used to produce secondary amines via reductive amination. The catalyst can also effect hydrogenolysis of organosulfur compounds, aldehydes, ketones, phenols and carboxylic acids to their respective alkanes. However, it suffers from low activity, often requiring hydrogen pressures above 96 MPa and temperatures above 185 °C.

== Research ==
MoS_{2} plays an important role in condensed matter physics research.

=== Hydrogen evolution ===
MoS_{2} and related molybdenum sulfides are efficient catalysts for hydrogen evolution, including the electrolysis of water; thus, are possibly useful to produce hydrogen for use in fuel cells.

=== Oxygen reduction and evolution ===
MoS_{2}@Fe-N-C core/shell nanosphere with atomic Fe-doped surface and interface (MoS_{2}/Fe-N-C) can be used as a used an electrocatalyst for oxygen reduction and evolution reactions (ORR and OER) bifunctionally because of reduced energy barrier due to Fe-N_{4} dopants and unique nature of MoS_{2}/Fe-N-C interface.

=== Microelectronics ===
As in graphene, the layered structures of MoS_{2} and other transition metal dichalcogenides exhibit electronic and optical properties that can differ from those in bulk. Bulk MoS_{2} has an indirect band gap of 1.2 eV, while MoS_{2} monolayers have a direct 1.8 eV electronic bandgap, supporting switchable transistors and photodetectors.

MoS_{2} nanoflakes can be used for solution-processed fabrication of layered memristive and memcapacitive devices through engineering a MoO_{x}/MoS_{2} heterostructure sandwiched between silver electrodes. MoS_{2}-based memristors are mechanically flexible, optically transparent and can be produced at low cost.

The sensitivity of a graphene field-effect transistor (FET) biosensor is fundamentally restricted by the zero band gap of graphene, which results in increased leakage and reduced sensitivity. In digital electronics, transistors control current flow throughout an integrated circuit and allow for amplification and switching. In biosensing, the physical gate is removed and the binding between embedded receptor molecules and the charged target biomolecules to which they are exposed modulates the current.

MoS_{2} has been investigated as a component of flexible circuits.

In 2017, a 115-transistor, 1-bit microprocessor implementation was fabricated using two-dimensional MoS_{2}.

In 2025, a team of engineers at Fudan University fabricated a 5900-transistor implementation of a RISC-V microprocessor using two-dimensional MoS_{2}.

=== Valleytronics ===
Due to the lack of spatial inversion symmetry, odd-layer MoS2 is a promising material for valleytronics because both the CBM and VBM have two energy-degenerate valleys at the corners of the first Brillouin zone, providing an exciting opportunity to store the information of 0s and 1s at different discrete values of the crystal momentum. The Berry curvature is even under spatial inversion (P) and odd under time reversal (T), the valley Hall effect cannot survive when both P and T symmetries are present. To excite valley Hall effect in specific valleys, circularly polarized lights were used for breaking the T symmetry in atomically thin transition-metal dichalcogenides. In monolayer MoS_{2}, the T and mirror symmetries lock the spin and valley indices of the sub-bands split by the spin-orbit couplings, both of which are flipped under T; the spin conservation suppresses the inter-valley scattering. Therefore, monolayer MoS2 have been deemed an ideal platform for realizing intrinsic valley Hall effect without extrinsic symmetry breaking.

=== Photonics and photovoltaics ===
MoS_{2} also possesses mechanical strength, electrical conductivity, and can emit light, opening possible applications such as photodetectors. MoS_{2} has been investigated as a component of photoelectrochemical (e.g. for photocatalytic hydrogen production) applications and for microelectronics applications.

=== Superconductivity of monolayers ===
Under an electric field MoS_{2} monolayers have been found to superconduct at temperatures below 9.4 K.

=== Spintronics ===
MoS_{2} has been found to reduce damping in spintronics.

== See also ==
- Molybdenum diselenide
