= Tribology =

Science of rubbing surfaces

Tribology is the science and engineering of understanding friction, lubrication, and wear phenomena for interacting surfaces in relative motion. It is highly interdisciplinary, drawing on many academic fields, including physics, chemistry, materials science, mathematics, biology and engineering. The fundamental objects of study in tribology are tribosystems, which are physical systems of contacting surfaces. Subfields of tribology include biotribology, nanotribology and space tribology. It is also related to other areas such as the coupling of corrosion and tribology in tribocorrosion and the contact mechanics of how surfaces in contact deform. Approximately 20% of the world's energy (2012) is consumed by friction and wear in the transportation, manufacturing, power generation, and residential sectors.

== Etymology ==
The word tribology derives from the Greek root τριβ- of the verb τρίβω, tribo, "I rub" in classic Greek, and the suffix -logy from -λογία, -logia "study of", "knowledge of". Peter Jost coined the word in 1966, in the eponymous report which highlighted the cost of friction, wear, and corrosion to the UK economy.

== History ==
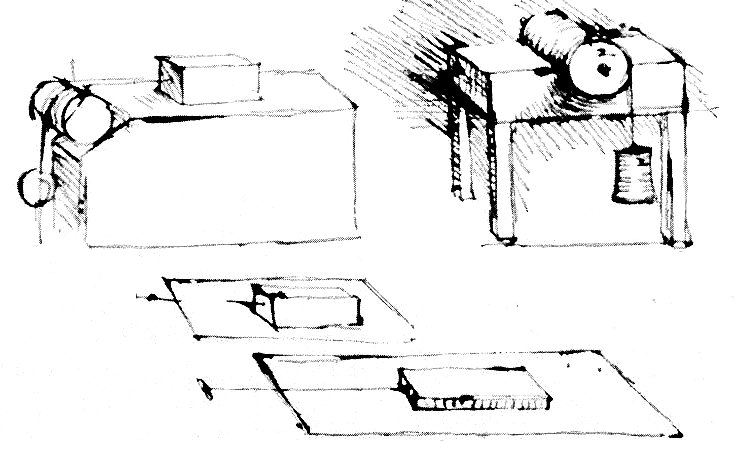
Tribological experiments suggested by Leonardo da Vinci

=== Early history ===
Despite the relatively recent naming of the field of tribology, quantitative studies of friction can be traced as far back as 1493, when Leonardo da Vinci first noted the two fundamental 'laws' of friction. According to Leonardo, frictional resistance was the same for two different objects of the same weight but making contact over different widths and lengths. He also observed that the force needed to overcome friction doubles as weight doubles. However, Leonardo's findings remained unpublished in his notebooks.

The two fundamental 'laws' of friction were first published (in 1699) by Guillaume Amontons, with whose name they are now usually associated. They state that:

- the force of friction acting between two sliding surfaces is proportional to the load pressing the surfaces together
- the force of friction is independent of the apparent area of contact between the two surfaces.

Although not universally applicable, these simple statements hold for a surprisingly wide range of systems. These laws were further developed by Charles-Augustin de Coulomb (in 1785), who noticed that static friction force may depend on the contact time and sliding (kinetic) friction may depend on sliding velocity, normal force, and contact area.

In 1798, Charles Hatchett and Henry Cavendish carried out the first reliable test on frictional wear. In a study commissioned by the Privy Council of the UK, they used a simple reciprocating machine to evaluate the wear rate of gold coins. They found that coins with grit between them wore at a faster rate compared to self-mated coins. In 1860, Theodor Reye (Note: Theodor Reye was a polytechnician in Zürich, in 1860, but later became a professor in Straßburg, according to Moritz (1885) p. 535.) proposed Reye's hypothesis. In 1953, John Frederick Archard developed the Archard equation, which describes sliding wear and is based on the theory of asperity contact.

Other pioneers of tribology research are the Australian physicist Frank Philip Bowden and British physicist David Tabor, both of the Cavendish Laboratory at Cambridge University. Together they wrote the seminal textbook The Friction and Lubrication of Solids (Part I originally published in 1950 and Part II in 1964). Michael J. Neale was another leader in the field during the mid-to-late 1900s. He specialized in solving problems in machine design by applying his knowledge of tribology. Neale was respected as an educator with a gift for integrating theoretical work with his own practical experience to produce easy-to-understand design guides. The Tribology Handbook, which he first edited in 1973 and updated in 1995, is still used around the world and forms the basis of numerous training courses for engineering designers.

Duncan Dowson surveyed the field in his History of Tribology (2nd edition, 1997). This covers developments from prehistory through early civilizations (Mesopotamia, ancient Egypt) and on into the present day and highlights key developments.

=== Jost report ===
The term tribology became widely used following The Jost Report published in 1966. The report highlighted the huge cost of friction, wear and corrosion to the UK economy (1.1–1.4% of GDP). As a result, the UK government established several national centres to address tribological problems. Since then the term has diffused internationally, with many specialists now identifying as "tribologists".

== Significance ==
Despite considerable research since the Jost Report, the global consequences of friction and wear on energy consumption, economic expenditure, and carbon dioxide emissions are still considerable. In 2017, Kenneth Holmberg and Ali Erdemir attempted to quantify their impact worldwide. They considered the four main energy-consuming sectors: transport, manufacturing, power generation, and residential. The following were concluded:

- In total, ~23% of the world's energy consumption originates from tribological contacts. Of that, 20% is to overcome friction and 3% to remanufacture worn parts and spare equipment because of wear and wear-related causes.
- By friction reduction and wear protection, lowered energy losses in machinery could lower total energy consumption.
- The largest short term energy savings are envisioned in transport (25%) and in power generation (20%) while the potential savings in the manufacturing and residential sectors are estimated to be ~10%. In the longer term, savings would be 55%, 40%, 25%, and 20%, respectively.
- Implementing advanced tribological technologies can also reduce global carbon dioxide emissions by as much as 1460 million tons of carbon dioxide equivalent (MtCO_{2}) and result in €4.5 billion (US$5.0 billion) cost savings in the short term. In the long term, the reduction could be as large as 3140 MtCO_{2} and the cost savings €9.7 billion (US$11 billion).

Classical tribology covering such applications as ball bearings, gear drives, clutches, brakes, etc., was developed in the context of mechanical engineering. It also embraces micro- and nanotechnology as well as aspects of biology and medicine.

== Fundamental concepts ==
=== Tribosystem ===
The concept of tribosystems is used to provide a detailed assessment of relevant inputs, outputs and losses to tribological systems. Knowledge of these parameters allows tribologists to devise test procedures for tribological systems.

=== Tribofilm ===
Tribofilms are thin films that form on tribologically stressed surfaces. They play an important role in reducing friction and wear in tribological systems.

=== Stribeck curve ===
The Stribeck curve shows how friction in fluid-lubricated contacts is a non-linear function of lubricant viscosity, entrainment velocity and contact load.

== Physics ==
=== Friction ===
The word friction comes from the Latin "frictionem", which means rubbing. This term is used to describe all those dissipative phenomena, capable of producing heat and of opposing the relative motion between two surfaces. There are two main types of friction:

Static friction
Occurs between surfaces in a fixed state, or relatively stationary.
Dynamic friction
Occurs between surfaces in relative motion.

The study of friction phenomena is a predominantly empirical study and does not allow to reach precise results, but only to useful approximate conclusions. This inability to obtain a definite result is due to the extreme complexity of the phenomenon. If it is studied more closely it presents new elements, which, in turn, make the global description even more complex.

==== Laws of friction ====
All the theories and studies on friction can be simplified into three main laws, which are valid in most cases:

First law of Amontons
The frictional force is directly proportional to the normal load.
Second law of Amontons
Friction is independent of the apparent area of contact.
Third law of Coulomb
Dynamic friction is independent of the relative sliding speed.

Coulomb later found deviations from Amontons' laws in some cases. In systems with significant nonuniform stress fields, Amontons' laws are not satisfied macroscopically because local slip occurs before the entire system slides.

==== Static friction ====
Consider a block of a certain mass $m$, placed in a quiet position on a horizontal plane. To move the block, an external force $\vec F_\text{out}$ must be applied, in this way we observe a certain resistance to the motion given by a force equal to and opposite to the applied force, which is precisely the static frictional force $\vec F_\text{sf}$.

By continuously increasing the applied force, we obtain a value such that the block starts instantly to move. At this point, also taking into account the first two friction laws stated above, it is possible to define the static friction force as a force equal in modulus to the minimum force required to cause the motion of the block, and the coefficient of static friction $\mu$ as the ratio of the static friction force $\vec F_\text{sf}$. and the normal force at block $\vec N$, obtaining
$${\left|\vec F_\text{sf}\right|}\leq \mu {\left|\vec N\right|} .$$

==== Dynamic friction ====
Once the block has been put into motion, the block experiences a friction force with a lesser intensity than the static friction force $\vec F_\text{sf}$. The friction force during relative motion is known as the dynamic friction force $\vec F_\text{df}$. In this case it is necessary to take into account not only the first two laws of Amontons, but also of the law of Coulomb, so as to be able to affirm that the relationship between dynamic friction force $\vec F_\text{df}$, coefficient of dynamic friction $k$ and normal force $N$ is the following:
$$\left|\vec F_\text{df}\right|= k {\left|\vec N\right|} .$$

==== Static and dynamic friction coefficients ====
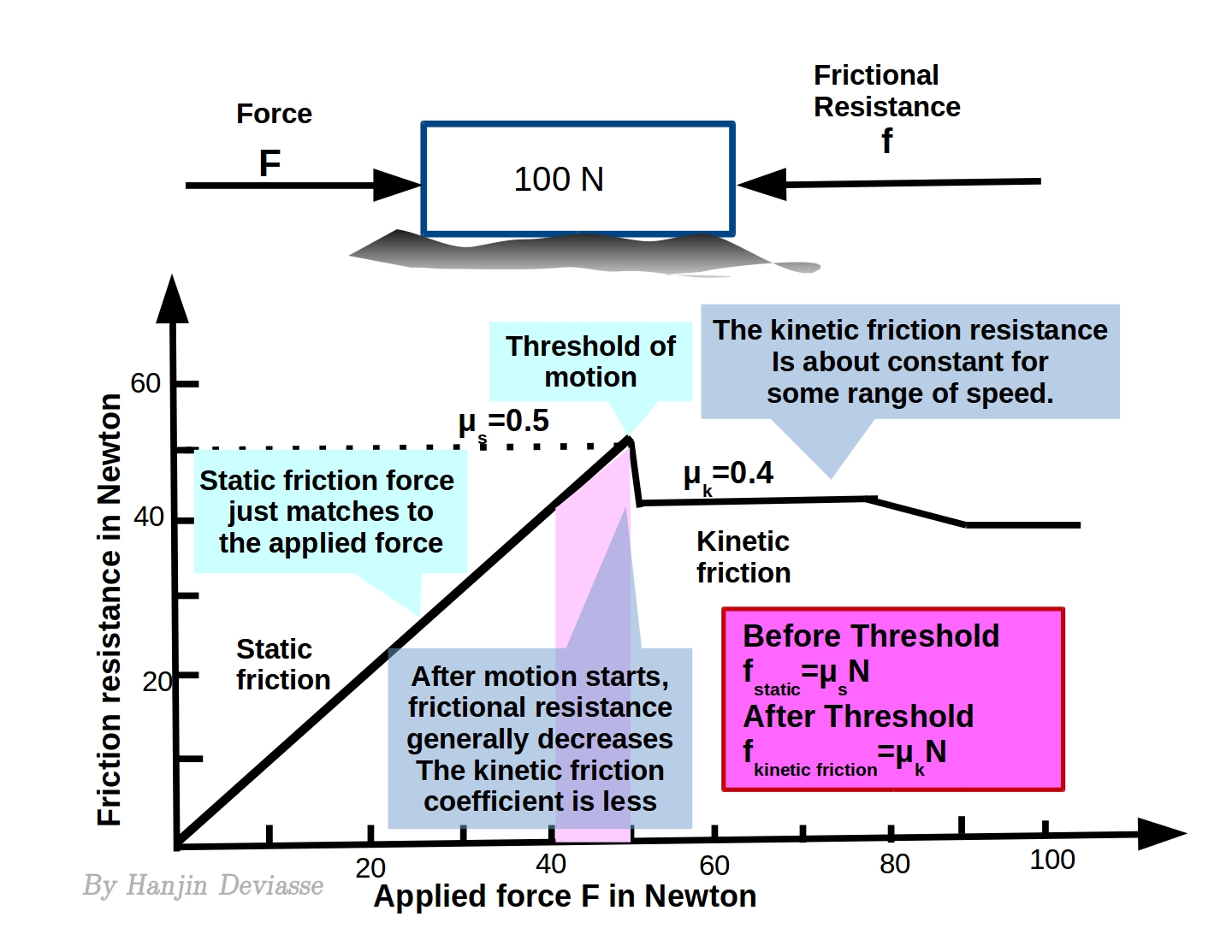
Dynamic and static coefficients of friction

At this point it is possible to summarize the main properties of the static friction coefficients $\mu$ and the dynamic one $k$.

These coefficients are dimensionless quantities, given by the ratio between the intensity of the friction force $\vec F_{f}$ and the intensity of the applied load $\vec W$, depending on the type of surfaces that are involved in a mutual contact, and in any case, the condition is always valid such that: $\mu > k$.

Usually, the value of both coefficients does not exceed the unit and can be considered constant only within certain ranges of forces and velocities, outside of which there are extreme conditions that modify these coefficients and variables.

In systems with significant nonuniform stress fields, the macroscopic static friction coefficient depends on the external pressure, system size, or shape because local slip occurs before the system slides.

The following table shows the values of the static and dynamic friction coefficients for common materials:

Table of static and dynamic friction coefficients most used
Contact surfaces	Static friction	Dynamic friction
Wood–wood	0.25–0.5	0.2
Wood–cardboard	0.32	0.23
Ice–ice	0.1	0.02
Scioled wood ski–snow	0.04	0.04
Glass–glass	0.9–1.0	0.4
Steel–steel (smooth)	0.6	0.6
Steel–steel (lubricated)	0.09	0.05
Steel–ice	0.1	0.05
Steel–ice (dry)	0.78	0.42
Steel–aluminum	0.61	0.47
Steel–brass	0.51	0.44
Steel–air	0.001	0.001
Steel–PTFE	0.04	0.04
PTFE–PTFE	0.04	0.04
Rubber–cement (dry)	1.0	0.8
Rubber–cement (wet)	0.7	0.5
Copper–steel	0.53	0.36
Copper–glass	0.68	0.53
Synovial joints	0.01	0.003

==== Rolling friction ====
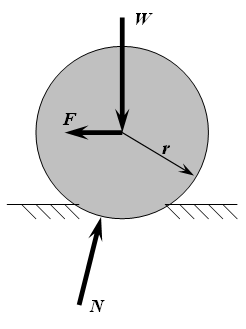
Rolling friction

In the case of bodies capable of rolling, there is a particular type of friction, in which the sliding phenomenon, typical of dynamic friction, does not occur, but there is also a force that opposes the motion, which also excludes the case of static friction. This type of friction is called rolling friction. Now we want to observe in detail what happens to a wheel that rolls on a horizontal plane. Initially the wheel is immobile and the forces acting on it are the weight force $m \vec g$ and the normal force $\vec N$ given by the response to the weight of the floor.

At this point the wheel is set in motion, causing a displacement at the point of application of the normal force which is now applied in front of the center of the wheel, at a distance $b$, which is equal to the value of the rolling friction coefficient. The opposition to the motion is caused by the separation of the normal force and the weight force at the exact moment in which the rolling starts, so the value of the torque given by the rolling friction force is
$${\vec M_\text{rf}} = \vec b \times m \vec g$$
What happens in detail at the microscopic level between the wheel and the supporting surface is described in Figure, where it is possible to observe what is the behavior of the reaction forces of the deformed plane acting on an immobile wheel.

Rolling the wheel continuously causes imperceptible deformations of the plane and, once passed to a subsequent point, the plane returns to its initial state. In the compression phase the plane opposes the motion of the wheel, while in the decompression phase it provides a positive contribution to the motion.

The force of rolling friction depends, therefore, on the small deformations suffered by the supporting surface and by the wheel itself, and can be expressed as $\vert\vec F_ {r}\vert = b \vert\vec N\vert$, where it is possible to express $b$ in relation to the sliding friction coefficient $\mu$ as $b = \tfrac{\mu v}{r}$, with $r$ being the wheel radius.

==== Surfaces ====
Going even deeper, it is possible to study not only the most external surface of the metal, but also the immediately more internal states, linked to the history of the metal, its composition and the manufacturing processes undergone by the latter.

it is possible to divide the metal into four different layers:

1. Crystalline structure – basic structure of the metal, bulk interior form;
2. Machined layer – layer which may also have inclusions of foreign material and which derives from the processing processes to which the metal has been subjected;
3. Hardened layer – has a crystalline structure of greater hardness than the inner layers, thanks to the rapid cooling to which they are subjected in the working processes;
4. Outer layer or oxide layer – layer that is created due to chemical interaction with the metal's environment and from the deposition of impurities.

The layer of oxides and impurities (third body) has a fundamental tribological importance, in fact it usually contributes to reducing friction. Another fact of fundamental importance regarding oxides is that if you could clean and smooth the surface in order to obtain a pure "metal surface", what we would observe is the union of the two surfaces in contact. In fact, in the absence of thin layers of contaminants, the atoms of the metal in question, are not able to distinguish one body from another, thus going to form a single body if put in contact.

Surface engineering techniques such as deposition of hard nitride coatings are widely used to improve tribological behaviour of mechanical components. Multicomponent coatings including Cr–V–N deposited by cathodic arc evaporation have demonstrated improved wear resistance and friction performance.

==== Origin of friction ====
Contact between surfaces is made up of a large number of microscopic regions, in the literature called asperities or junctions of contact, where atom-to-atom contact takes place. The phenomenon of friction, and therefore of the dissipation of energy, is due precisely to the deformations that such regions undergo due to the load and relative movement. Plastic, elastic, or rupture deformations can be observed:

- Plastic deformations – permanent deformations of the shape of the bumps;
- Elastic deformations – deformations in which the energy expended in the compression phase is almost entirely recovered in the decompression phase (elastic hysteresis);
- Break deformations – deformations that lead to the breaking of bumps and the creation of new contact areas.

The energy that is dissipated during the phenomenon is transformed into heat, thus increasing the temperature of the surfaces in contact. The increase in temperature also depends on the relative speed and the roughness of the material, it can be so high as to even lead to the fusion of the materials involved.

In friction phenomena, temperature is fundamental in many areas of application. For example, a rise in temperature may result in a sharp reduction of the friction coefficient, and consequently, the effectiveness of the brakes.

==== Cohesion theory ====
The adhesion theory states that in the case of spherical asperities in contact with each other, subjected to a $\vec W$ load, a deformation is observed, which, as the load increases, passes from an elastic to a plastic deformation. This phenomenon involves an enlargement of the real contact area $A_\text{r}$, which for this reason can be expressed as:
$$A_\text{r} = {\vec W \over D} ,$$
where $D$ is the hardness of the material definable as the applied load divided by the area of the contact surface.

If at this point the two surfaces are sliding between them, a resistance to shear stress $t$ is observed, given by the presence of adhesive bonds, which were created precisely because of the plastic deformations, and therefore the frictional force will be given by
$$\vec F_\text{a} = A_\text{r} \vec t$$
At this point, since the coefficient of friction is the ratio between the intensity of the frictional force and that of the applied load, it is possible to state that
$$\mu = {t \over D}$$
thus relating to the two material properties: shear strength $t$ and hardness. To obtain low value friction coefficients $\mu$ it is possible to resort to materials which require less shear stress, but which are also very hard. In the case of lubricants, in fact, we use a substrate of material with low cutting stress $t$, placed on a very hard material.

The force acting between two solids in contact will not only have normal components, as implied so far, but will also have tangential components. This further complicates the description of the interactions between roughness, because due to this tangential component plastic deformation comes with a lower load than when ignoring this component. A more realistic description then of the area of each single junction that is created is given by
$${A_\text{i}} ^ 2 = \left(\frac {\vec W_\text{i}}{D} \right) ^ 2 + \alpha \left(\frac{\vec F_\text{i}}{D}\right) ^ 2$$
with $\alpha$ constant and a "tangent" force $\vec F_\text{i}$ applied to the joint.

To obtain even more realistic considerations, the phenomenon of the third body should also be considered, i.e., the presence of foreign materials, such as moisture, oxides or lubricants, between the two solids in contact. A coefficient $c$ is then introduced which is able to correlate the shear strength $t$ of the pure "material" and that of the third body $t_\text{tb}$
$$t = c \cdot t_\text{tb}$$
with $0 < c < 1$.

By studying the behavior at the limits it will be that for $c = 0$, $t = 0$ and for $c = 1$ it returns to the condition in which the surfaces are directly in contact and there is no presence of a third body. Keeping in mind what has just been said, it is possible to correct the friction coefficient formula as follows:
$$\mu = \frac{c}{[\alpha (1-c ^ 2)] ^ {1/2}}$$
In conclusion, the case of elastic bodies in interaction with each other is considered.

Similarly to what we have just seen, it is possible to define an equation of the type
$$A = K \vec W$$
where, in this case, $K$ depends on the elastic properties of the materials. Also for the elastic bodies the tangential force depends on the coefficient $c$ seen above, and it will be
$$\vec F_ {T} = cAs$$
and therefore a fairly exhaustive description of the friction coefficient can be obtained
$$\mu = cKs .$$

==== Friction measurements ====
The simplest and most immediate method for evaluating the friction coefficient of two surfaces is the use of an inclined plane on which a block of material is made to slide. As can be seen in the figure, the normal force of the plane is given by $mg \cos \theta$, while the frictional force is equal to $mg \sin \theta$. This allows us to state that the coefficient of friction can be calculated very easily, by means of the tangent of the angle in which the block begins to slip. In fact we have
$$\mu = {F_\text{a} \over N} = {mg \sin \theta \over mg \cos \theta} = {\sin \theta \over \cos \theta} = \tan \theta$$
Then from the inclined plane we moved on to more sophisticated systems, which allow us to consider all the possible environmental conditions in which the measurement is made, such as the cross-roller machine or the pin and disk machine. Today there are digital machines such as the "Friction Tester" which allows, by means of a software support, to insert all the desired variables. Another widely used process is the ring compression test. A flat ring of the material to be studied is plastically deformed by means of a press, if the deformation is an expansion in both the inner and the outer circle, then there will be low or zero friction coefficients. Otherwise for a deformation that expands only in the inner circle there will be increasing friction coefficients.

=== Lubrication ===
To reduce friction between surfaces and keep wear under control, materials called lubricants are used. Unlike what you might think, these are not just oils or fats, but any fluid material that is characterized by viscosity, such as air and water. Of course, some lubricants are more suitable than others, depending on the type of use they are intended for: air and water, for example, are readily available, but the former can only be used under limited load and speed conditions, while the second can contribute to the wear of materials.

What we try to achieve by means of these materials is a perfect fluid lubrication, or a lubrication such that it is possible to avoid direct contact between the surfaces in question, inserting a lubricant film between them. To do this there are two possibilities, depending on the type of application, the costs to address and the level of "perfection" of the lubrication desired to be achieved, there is a choice between:

- Fluidostatic lubrication (or hydrostatic in the case of mineral oils) – which consists in the insertion of lubricating material under pressure between the surfaces in contact;
- Fluid fluid lubrication (or hydrodynamics) – which consists in exploiting the relative motion between the surfaces to make the lubricating material penetrate.

==== Viscosity ====
The viscosity is the equivalent of friction in fluids, it describes the ability of fluids to resist the forces that cause a change in shape.

Thanks to Newton's studies, a deeper understanding of the phenomenon has been achieved. He, in fact, introduced the concept of laminar flow: "a flow in which the velocity changes from layer to layer". It is possible to ideally divide a fluid between two surfaces ($S_{1}$, $S_{2}$) of area $A$, in various layers.

The layer in contact with the surface $S_{2}$, which moves with a velocity $v$ due to an applied force $F$, will have the same velocity as v of the slab, while each immediately following layer will vary this velocity of a quantity $dv$, up to the layer in contact with the immobile surface $S_{1}$, which will have zero speed.

From what has been said, it is possible to state that the force $F$, necessary to cause a rolling motion in a fluid contained between two plates, is proportional to the area of the two surfaces and to the speed gradient:
$$F \propto A {dv \over dy} .$$
At this point we can introduce a proportional constant $\mu$, which corresponds to the dynamic viscosity coefficient of the fluid, to obtain the following equation, known as Newton's law
$$F = \mu A {dv \over dy}$$
The speed varies by the same amount $dv$ of layer in layer and then the condition occurs so that $dv / dy = v / L$, where $L$ is the distance between the surfaces $S_{1}$ and $S_{2}$, and then we can simplify the equation by writing
$$F = \mu A {v \over L} .$$
The viscosity $\mu$ is high in fluids that strongly oppose the motion, while it is contained for fluids that flow easily.

Table of viscosity coefficients $\mu$ for some fluids
Fluid	$\mu$
CO_{2}	1.5×10^{−5} Pa⋅s
Air	1.8×10^{−5} Pa⋅s
Gasoline	2.9×10^{−4} Pa⋅s
Water (90 °C)	0.32×10^{−3} Pa⋅s
Water (20 °C)	1.0×10^{−3} Pa⋅s
Blood (37 °C)	4.0×10^{−3} Pa⋅s
Oil (20 °C)	0.03 Pa⋅s
Oil (0 °C)	0.11 Pa⋅s
Glycerin	1.5 Pa⋅s

To determine what kind of flow is in the study, we observe its Reynolds number
$$Re = { {\rho L v} \over \mu}$$
This is a constant that depends on the fluid mass $\rho$ of the fluid, on its viscosity $\mu$ and on the diameter $L$ of the tube in which the fluid flows. If the Reynolds number is relatively low then there is a laminar flow, whereas for $\mathrm{Re} \simeq 2000$ the flow becomes turbulent.

To conclude we want to underline that it is possible to divide the fluids into two types according to their viscosity:

1. Newtonian fluids, or fluids in which viscosity is a function of temperature and fluid pressure only and not of velocity gradient;
2. Non-Newtonian fluids, or fluids in which viscosity also depends on the velocity gradient.

==== Viscosity as a function of temperature and pressure ====
Temperature and pressure are two fundamental factors to evaluate when choosing a lubricant instead of another. Consider the effects of temperature initially.

There are three main causes of temperature variation that can affect the behavior of the lubricant:

- Weather conditions;
- Local thermal factors (like for car engines or refrigeration pumps);
- Energy dissipation due to rubbing between surfaces.

In order to classify the various lubricants according to their viscosity behavior as a function of temperature, in 1929 the viscosity index (V.I.) was introduced by Dean and Davis. These assigned the best lubricant then available, namely the oil of Pennsylvania, the viscosity index 100, and at the worst, the American oil of the Gulf Coast, the value 0. To determine the value of the intermediate oil index, the following procedure is used: two reference oils are chosen so that the oil in question has the same viscosity at 100 °C, and the following equation is used to determine the viscosity index
$$V.I. = {{L-O_ \text{test}} \over {L-H}} \times 100$$
This process has some disadvantages:

- For mixtures of oils the results are not exact;
- There is no information if you are outside the fixed temperature range;
- With the advancement of the technologies, oils with V.I. more than 100, which can not be described by the method above.

In the case of oils with V.I. above 100 you can use a different relationship that allows you to get exact results
$$V.I. = {{10 ^ {N-1} }\over {0.00715 }}+ 100$$
$$N = {{\operatorname{Log} (H) - \operatorname{Log} (O_ \text{test})} \over {\operatorname{Log} (v)}}$$
where, in this case, $H$ is the viscosity at 100 °F (38 °C) of the oil with V.I. = 100 and $v$ is the kinematic viscosity of the study oil at 210 °F (99 °C).

We can therefore say, in conclusion, that an increase in temperature leads to a decrease in the viscosity of the oil. It is also useful to keep in mind that, in the same way, an increase in pressure implies an increase in viscosity. To evaluate the effects of pressure on viscosity, the following equation is used
$$\mu = \mu_ {0} \exp {(\alpha p)}$$
where $\mu$ is the pressure viscosity coefficient $p$, $\mu_ {0}$ is the viscosity coefficient at atmospheric pressure and $\alpha$ is a constant that describes the relationship between viscosity and pressure.

==== Viscosity measures ====
To determine the viscosity of a fluid, viscosimeters are used which can be divided into 3 main categories:

- Capillary viscometers, in which the viscosity of the fluid is measured by sliding it into a capillary tube;
- Solid drop viscometers, in which viscosity is measured by calculating the velocity of a solid that moves in the fluid;
- Rotational viscometers, in which viscosity is obtained by evaluating the flow of fluid placed between two surfaces in relative motion.

The first two types of viscometers are mainly used for Newtonian fluids, while the third is very versatile.

=== Wear ===
The wear is the progressive involuntary removal of material from a surface in relative motion with another or with a fluid. We can distinguish two different types of wear: moderate wear and severe wear. The first case concerns low loads and smooth surfaces, while the second concerns significantly higher loads and compatible and rough surfaces, in which the wear processes are much more violent. Wear plays a fundamental role in tribological studies, since it causes changes in the shape of the components used in the construction of machinery (for example). These worn parts must be replaced and this entails both a problem of an economic nature, due to the cost of replacement, and a functional problem, since if these components are not replaced in time, more serious damage could occur to the machine in its complex. This phenomenon, however, has not only negative sides, indeed, it is often used to reduce the roughness of some materials, eliminating the asperities. Erroneously we tend to imagine wear in a direct correlation with friction, in reality these two phenomena can not be easily connected. There may be conditions such that low friction can result in significant wear and vice versa. In order for this phenomenon to occur, certain implementation times are required, which may change depending on some variables, such as load, speed, lubrication and environmental conditions, and there are different wear mechanisms, which may occur simultaneously or even combined with each other:

1. Adhesive wear;
2. Abrasive wear;
3. Fatigue wear;
4. Corrosive wear;
5. Rubbing wear or fretting;
6. Erosion wear;
7. Other minor wear phenomena (wear by impact, cavitation, wear-fusion, wear-spreading).

==== Adhesive wear ====
As known, the contact between two surfaces occurs through the interaction between asperities. If a shearing force is applied in the contact area, it may be possible to detach a small part of the weaker material, due to its adhesion to the harder surface. What is described is precisely the mechanism of the adhesive wear represented in the figure. This type of wear is very problematic, since it involves high wear speeds, but at the same time it is possible to reduce adhesion by increasing surface roughness and hardness of the surfaces involved, or by inserting layers of contaminants such as oxygen, oxides, water, or oils. In conclusion, the behavior of the adhesive wear volume can be described by means of three main laws

Law 1 – Distance
The mass involved in wear is proportional to the distance traveled in the rubbing between the surfaces.
Law 2 – Load
The mass involved in wear is proportional to the applied load.
Law 3 – Hardness
The mass involved in wear is inversely proportional to the hardness of the less hard material.

An important aspect of wear is emission of wear particles into the environment which increasingly threatens human health and ecology. The first researcher who investigated this topic was Ernest Rabinowicz.

==== Abrasive wear ====
The abrasive wear consists of the cutting effort of hard surfaces that act on softer surfaces and can be caused either by the roughness that as tips cut off the material against which they rub (two-body abrasive wear), or from particles of hard material that interpose between two surfaces in relative motion (three-body abrasive wear). At application levels, the two-body wear is easily eliminated by means of an adequate surface finish, while the three-body wear can bring serious problems and must therefore be removed as much as possible by means of suitable filters, even before of a weighted machine design.

==== Fatigue wear ====
The fatigue wear is a type of wear that is caused by alternative loads, which cause local contact forces repeated over time, which in turn lead to deterioration of the materials involved. The most immediate example of this type of wear is that of a comb. If you slide a finger over the teeth of the comb over and over again, it is observed that at some point one or more teeth of the comb come off. This phenomenon can lead to the breaking of the surfaces due to mechanical or thermal causes. The first case is that described above in which a repeated load causes high contact stresses. The second case, however, is caused by the thermal expansion of the materials involved in the process. To reduce this type of wear, therefore, it is good to try to decrease both the contact forces and the thermal cycling, that is the frequency with which different temperatures intervene. For optimal results it is also good to eliminate, as much as possible, impurities between surfaces, local defects and inclusions of foreign materials in the bodies involved.

==== Corrosive wear ====
The corrosive wear occurs in the presence of metals that oxidize or corrode. When the pure metal surfaces come into contact with the surrounding environment, oxide films are created on their surfaces because of the contaminants present in the environment itself, such as water, oxygen or acids. These films are continually removed from the abrasive and adhesive wear mechanisms, continually recreated by pure-contaminating metal interactions. Clearly this type of wear can be reduced by trying to create an 'ad hoc' environment, free of pollutants and sensible to minimal thermal changes. Corrosive wear can also be positive in some applications. In fact, the oxides that are created, contribute to decrease the coefficient of friction between the surfaces, or, being in many cases harder than the metal to which they belong, can be used as excellent abrasives.

==== Rubbing wear or fretting ====
The rubbing wear occurs in systems subject to more or less intense vibrations, which cause relative movements between the surfaces in contact within the order of nanometers. These microscopic relative movements cause both adhesive wear, caused by the displacement itself, and abrasive wear, caused by the particles produced in the adhesive phase, which remain trapped between the surfaces. This type of wear can be accelerated by the presence of corrosive substances and the increase in temperature.

==== Erosion wear ====
The erosion wear occurs when free particles, which can be either solid or liquid, hit a surface, causing abrasion. The mechanisms involved are of various kinds and depend on certain parameters, such as the impact angle, the particle size, the impact velocity and the material of which the particles are made up.

==== Factors affecting wear ====
Among the main factors influencing wear we find

- Hardness
- Mutual Solubility
- Crystalline structure

It has been verified that the harder a material is, the more it decreases. In the same way, the less two materials are mutually soluble, the more the wear tends to decrease. Finally, as regards the crystalline structure, it is possible to state that some structures are more suitable to resist the wear of others, such as a hexagonal structure with a compact distribution, which can only deform by slipping along the base planes.

==== Wear rate ====
To provide an assessment of the damage caused by wear, we use a dimensionless coefficient called wear rate, given by the ratio between the height change of the body $\Delta h$ and the length of the relative sliding $\Delta l$.
$$T_ \text{wear} = {\delta h \over \Delta l}$$
This coefficient makes it possible to subdivide, depending on its size, the damage suffered by various materials in different situations, passing from a modest degree of wear, through a medium, to a degree of severe wear.

Class	$T_\text{usury}$	Usage level
0	10^{− 13} − 10^{−12}	Moderate
1	10^{−12} − 10^{−11}	Moderate
2	10^{−11} − 10^{−10}	Moderate
3	10^{−10} − 10^{−9}	Medium
4	10^{−9} − 10^{−8}	Medium
5	10^{−8} − 10^{−7}	Medium
6	10^{−7} − 10^{−6}	Medium
7	10^{−6} − 10^{−5}	Severe
8	10^{−5} − 10^{−4}	Severe
9	10^{−4} − 10^{−3}	Severe

Instead, to express the volume of wear $V$ it is possible to use the Holm equation

- $V = k {W \over H} l$ (for adhesive wear)
- $V = k_\text{a} {W \over H} l$ (for abrasive wear)

where $W / H$ represents the real contact area, $l$ the length of the distance traveled and $k$ and $k_ \text{a}$ are experimental dimensional factors.

The tribological behavior of structural alloys during sliding friction is strongly influenced by microstructure and phase composition. Austenitic manganese steels and manganese cast irons exhibit complex wear mechanisms associated with strain hardening, plastic deformation of the surface layer and the formation of wear products during friction.

==== Wear measurement ====
In experimental measurements of material wear, it is often necessary to recreate fairly small wear rates and to accelerate times. The phenomena, which in reality develop after years, in the laboratory must occur after a few days. A first evaluation of the wear processes is a visual inspection of the superficial profile of the body in the study, including a comparison before and after the occurrence of the wear phenomenon. In this first analysis the possible variations of the hardness and of the superficial geometry of the material are observed. Another method of investigation is that of the radioactive tracer, used to evaluate wear at macroscopic levels. One of the two materials in contact, involved in a wear process, is marked with a radioactive tracer. In this way, the particles of this material, which will be removed, will be easily visible and accessible. Finally, to accelerate wear times, one of the best-known techniques used is that of the high pressure contact tests. In this case, to obtain the desired results it is sufficient to apply the load on a very reduced contact area.

Automated analysis of wear debris morphology and distribution is useful for condition monitoring and predictive maintenance of mechanical systems. Diagnostic approaches include image-based classification, ferrographic analysis and machine-learning-assisted recognition of wear particle features. These developments complement studies applying computer-integrated surface image processing and artificial intelligence methods to identify wear products in hydrogen-affected steels and automotive tribotechnical systems, improving diagnostics of friction units operating under complex service conditions.

== Applications ==
=== Transport and manufacturing ===
Historically, tribology research concentrated on the design and effective lubrication of machine components, particularly for bearings. However, the study of tribology extends into most aspects of modern technology and any system where one material slides over another can be affected by complex tribological interactions.

Traditionally, tribology research in the transport industry focused on reliability, ensuring the safe, continuous operation of machine components. Nowadays, due to an increased focus on energy consumption, efficiency has become increasingly important and thus lubricants have become progressively more complex and sophisticated in order to achieve this. Tribology also plays an important role in manufacturing. For example, in metal-forming operations, friction increases tool wear and the power required to work a piece. This results in increased costs due to more frequent tool replacement, loss of tolerance as tool dimensions shift, and greater forces required to shape a piece.

Experimental tribological studies on high-nitrogen steels used in spark-ignition engine piston ring systems have shown that hydrogen-containing fuels and environmentally friendly lubricants can significantly modify wear intensity and friction behaviour under boundary lubrication conditions.

One of the more common materials in aerospace specifically is copper matrix self-lubricating composites, which use solid lubricants. These lubricants are mixed in with the copper and other materials, which is effectively done by resonant acoustic mixing.

The use of lubricants which minimize direct surface contact reduces tool wear and power requirements. It is also necessary to know the effects of manufacturing, all manufacturing methods leave a unique system fingerprint (i.e. surface topography) which will influence the tribocontact (e.g. lubricant film formation).

== Research ==
=== Fields ===
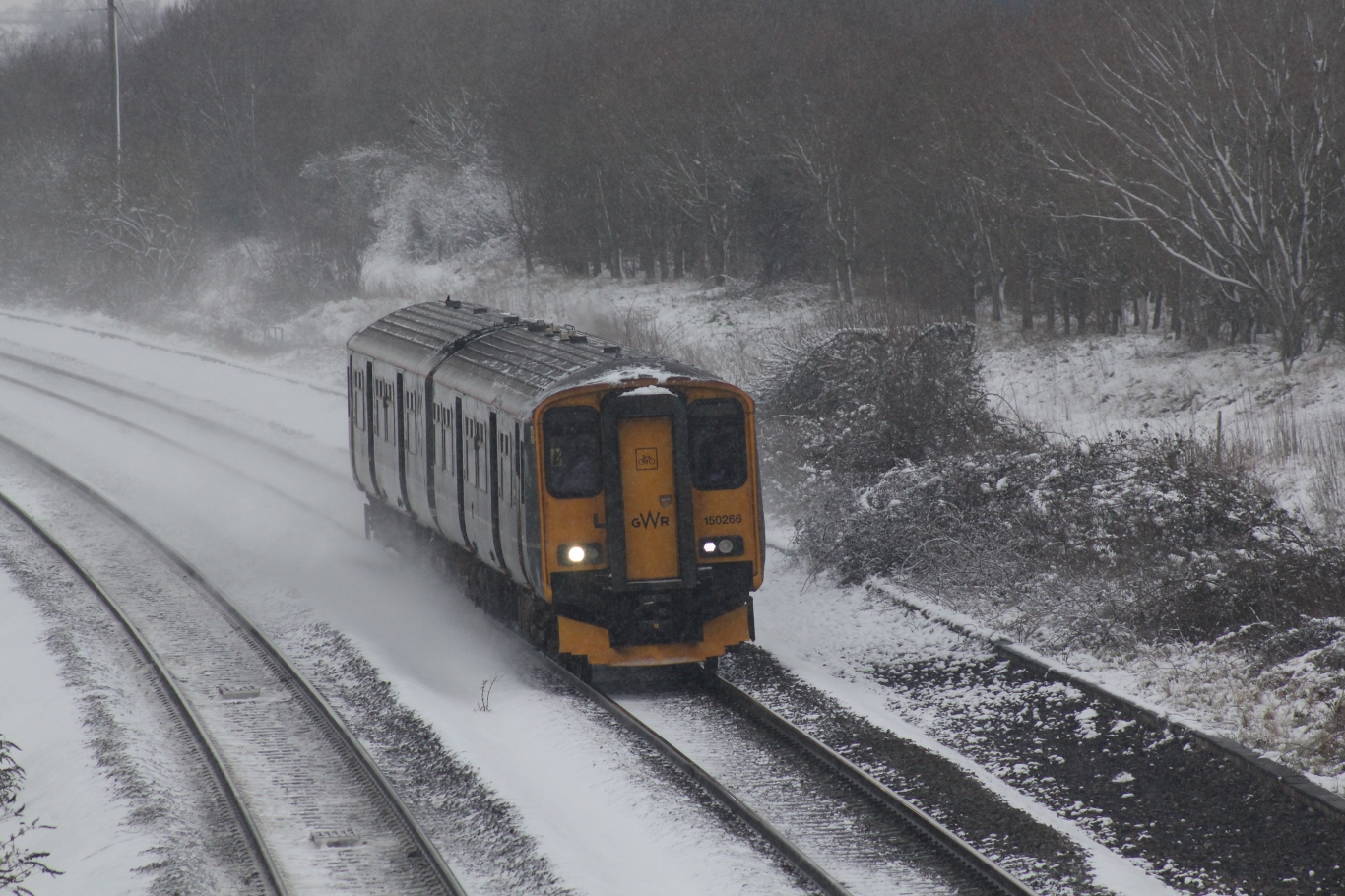
Open system tribology – wheel-rail contact in winter

Tribology research ranges from macro to nano scales, in areas as diverse as the movement of continental plates and glaciers to the locomotion of animals and insects. Tribology research is traditionally concentrated on transport and manufacturing sectors, but this has considerably diversified. Tribology research can be loosely divided into the following fields (with some overlap):

- Classical tribology is concerned with friction and wear in machine elements (such as rolling-element bearings, gears, plain bearings, brakes, clutches, wheels and fluid bearings) as well as manufacturing processes (such as metal forming).
- Biotribology studies friction, wear and lubrication in biological systems. The field is gaining importance as human lifetime expectancy increases. Human hip and knee joints are typical biotribology systems.
- Green tribology aims to minimize the environmental impact of tribological systems along their entire lifecycle. In particular, green tribology aims to reduce tribological losses (e.g., friction and wear) using technologies with minimal environmental impact. This is in contrast to traditional tribology, where the means of reducing tribological losses are not holistically evaluated.
- Geotribology studies friction, wear, and lubrication of geological systems, such as glaciers and faults.
- Nanotribology studies tribological phenomena at nanoscopic scales. The field is becoming increasingly important as devices become smaller (e.g. micro/nanoelectromechanical systems, MEMS/NEMS), and research has been aided by the invention of Atomic Force Microscopy.
- Computational tribology aims to model the behavior of tribological systems through multiphysics simulations, combining disciplines such as contact mechanics, fracture mechanics and computational fluid dynamics.
- Space tribology studies tribological systems that can operate under the extreme environmental conditions of outer space. In particular, this requires lubricants with low vapor pressure that can withstand extreme temperature fluctuations.
- Open system tribology studies tribological systems that are exposed to and affected by the natural environment.
- Triboinformatics is an application of Artificial Intelligence, Machine Learning and Big Data methods to tribological systems.

Superlubricity (phenomenon of vanishing friction) is topical, as are newer materials, such as graphene and ionic liquids, which are relevant to tribological problems.

=== Societies ===
There are now numerous national and international societies, including: the Society of Tribologists and Lubrication Engineers (STLE) in the US, the Institution of Mechanical Engineers and Institute of Physics (IMechE Tribology Group, IOP Tribology Group) in the UK, the German Society for Tribology (Gesellschaft für Tribologie), the Korean Tribology Society (KTS), the Malaysian Tribology Society (MYTRIBOS), the Japanese Society of Tribologists (JAST), the Tribology Society of India (TSI), the Chinese Mechanical Engineering Society (Chinese Tribology Institute) and the International Tribology Council.

== See also ==
- Antiwear additive – Additives for lubricants to prevent metal-to-metal contact
- Bearing – Mechanism to constrain relative movement to the desired motion and reduce friction
- Cold welding – Welding process in which joining occurs without melting or heating the interface
- Contact mechanics – Study of the deformation of solids that touch each other
- Fretting – Wear or damage on loaded surfaces
- Friction – Force resisting sliding motion
- Friction modifier – Lubricant additive to reduce friction and wear
- Galling – Form of wear caused by adhesion between sliding surfaces
- Leonardo da Vinci – Italian polymath (1452–1519)
- List of tribology organizations
- Lubricant – Substance introduced to reduce friction between surfaces in mutual contact
- Lubrication – Presence of a material to reduce friction between two surfaces
- Oil additive – Chemicals that improve oil performance
- Oil analysis – Laboratory analysis of an oil based lubricant's properties and contaminants
- Peter Jost – British mechanical engineer (1921–2016)
- Rolling contact fatigue – Deformation mechanism
- Sclerometer – Instrument used to measure the hardness of a material
- Space tribology – Tribological systems for spacecraft applications
- Surface science – Study of physical and chemical phenomena that occur at the interface of two phases
- Tribocorrosion – Material degradation due to corrosion and wear
- Tribometer – Instrument that measures friction and wear between surfaces
- Wear – Damaging, gradual removal or deformation of material at solid surfaces
- Zinc dithiophosphate – Lubricant additive
