= Tribosystem =

System containing contacting bodies

A tribosystem is a tribological system that consists of at least two contacting bodies and any environmental factor that affects their interaction. Tribologists study tribological systems in detail, and devise tribological test procedures.

== Definition ==
According to ASTM G40-17, a tribosystem is "any system that contains one or more triboelements, including all mechanical, chemical, and environmental factors relevant to tribological behavior." Here, triboelement refers to "one of two or more solid bodies that comprise a sliding, rolling, or abrasive contact, or a body subjected to impingement or cavitation."

More simply speaking, a tribosystem is a tribological system that consists of at least two contacting bodies, including the environment in which the interaction takes place. The complete description of a tribosystem includes all relevant factors that govern the tribological behavior of the system. Thus, depending on the aim of the tribological analysis, the tribosystem boundary is flexible and can be drawn more or less widely.

== Description ==
The description of tribosystems is based on a detailed assessment of relevant system inputs, outputs and losses, as well as an overall description of the system structure. The following table gives an overview.

Complete Description of a Tribosystem
Inputs	Outputs	Losses	System Structure
load; velocity; temperature; duration; disturbances; ...	motion (rotational, linear, ...); torque; force; changes in mechanical energy; ...	friction; wear; vibrations; ...	triboelements (incl. properties); system kinematics; interactions of triboelements

== Relevance ==
The complete description of a tribosystem is the first step when devising a tribological test procedure. Since tribological tests are often carried out on simplified model systems using standardized tribometers, a complete description of the tribosystem allows for tribological testing across different scales.

For example, if the tribological analysis aims to investigate a specific gear contact in a complex gearbox, exact knowledge of tribological inputs allows tribologists to devise a simplified test setup involving two gears only. Conversely, if the analysis aims to develop a new lubricant formulation for gearbox applications, a rough description of the gearbox-tribosystem allows to reduce testing to relevant system inputs. Thus, detailed knowledge of the tribosystem can significantly reduce the development effort for machines and lubricants.
