= Society of Tribologists and Lubrication Engineers =

International non-profit organization

- [[File:STLE Company |200px|upright=1]]
- Company type: non-profit/technical society
- Industry: tribology and lubrication engineering
- Founded: 1944
- Headquarters: Park Ridge, Illinois
- Website: www.stle.org

The Society of Tribologists and Lubrication Engineers (STLE) is a non-profit technical society for the tribology and lubrication engineering sectors worldwide. Its offices are in Park Ridge, Illinois.

Established in 1944 as the American Society of Lubrication Engineers (ASLE), the STLE is now one of the world's largest associations solely dedicated to the advancement of the field of tribology. STLE serves the needs of more than 15,000 individuals and 200 companies and organizations.

An official STLE journal, Tribology Transactions, is published by Taylor and Francis and the society is also affiliated with Tribology Letters journal, published by Springer. STLE also publishes a monthly magazine, Tribology and Lubrication Technology (TLT).
