= Molybdenum ditelluride =

- Mo^{4+}(Te^{2−})_{2}
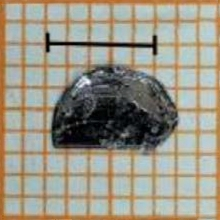

Names
- IUPAC name bis(tellanylidene)molybdenum
- Other names molybdenum(IV) telluride

Identifiers
CAS Number	12058-20-7
3D model (JSmol)	Interactive image
ChemSpider	58270
ECHA InfoCard	100.031.832
EC Number	235-028-4
PubChem CID	64728
CompTox Dashboard (EPA)	DTXSID9065235
- InChI: InChI=1Te/Mo.2Te; InChI=1/Mo.2Te/rMoS2/c2-1-3 Key: HITXEXPSQXNMAN-UHFFFAOYSA-N
- SMILES: [Te]=[Mo]=[Te]

Properties
Chemical formula	MoTe_{2}
Molar mass	351.14 g/mol
Appearance	black/lead-gray solid
Density	7.7 g/cm^{3}
Melting point	decomposes
Solubility in water	insoluble
Solubility	decomposed by nitric acid insoluble in non-oxidising acids
Band gap	1.1 eV (direct, monolayer); 0.9 eV (indirect, bulk)

Structure
Crystal structure	hP6, P6_{3}/mmc, No. 194 (α or 2H) mP12, P2_{1}/m, No. 11 (β or 1T)

Related compounds
Other anions	molybdenum(IV) oxide molybdenum disulfide molybdenum diselenide
Other cations	tungsten ditelluride, vanadium ditelluride
- Except where otherwise noted, data are given for materials in their standard state (at 25 °C [77 °F], 100 kPa). (what is ?) Infobox references

Molybdenum(IV) telluride, molybdenum ditelluride or just molybdenum telluride is an inorganic compound with formula MoTe_{2}. It is a semiconductor, and can fluoresce. It is one of the transition metal dichalcogenides. As a semiconductor the band gap lies in the infrared region. It has potential use as a semiconductor in electronics or an infrared detector. MoTe_{2} is black. Although sometimes described as Mo^{4+}, 2Te^{2-}, it is not ionic but highly covalent.

== Preparation ==
MoTe_{2} can be prepared by heating the correct ratio of the elements together at 1100 °C in a vacuum. Another method is via vapour deposition, where molybdenum and tellurium are volatilised in bromine gas and then deposited. Using bromine results in forming an n-type semiconductor, whereas using tellurium only results in a p-type semiconductor.

The amount of tellurium in molybdenum ditelluride can vary from 1.97 to 2. Excess tellurium deposited during this process can be dissolved off with sulfuric acid.

It can crystallise in two dimensional sheets which can be thinned down to monolayers that are flexible and almost transparent.

By annealing molybdenum film in a tellurium vapour at 850 to 870 K for several hours, a thin layer of MoTe_{2} is formed.

An amorphous form can be produced by sonochemically reacting molybdenum hexacarbonyl with tellurium dissolved in decalin.

Molybdenum ditelluride can be formed by electrodeposition from a solution of molybdic acid (H_{2}MoO_{4}) and tellurium dioxide (TeO_{2}). The product can be electroplated on stainless steel or indium tin oxide.

Tellurization of thin Mo film at 650 °C by chemical vapor deposition (CVD) leads to the hexagonal, semiconducting α-form (2H-MoTe_{2}) while using MoO_{3} film produces the monoclinic, semimetallic β-form (1T'-MoTe_{2}) at the same temperature of 650 °C.

== Physical properties ==
Very thin crystals of MoTe_{2} can be made using sticky tape. When they are thin around 500 nm thick red light can be transmitted. Even thinner layers can be orange or transparent. An absorption edge occurs in the spectrum with wavelengths longer than 6720 Å transmitted and shorter wavelengths heavily attenuated. At 77 K this edge changes to 6465 Å. This corresponds to deep red.

=== Infrared ===
MoTe_{2} reflects about 43% in the infrared band but has a peak at 234.5 cm^{−1} and a minimum at 245.8 cm^{−1}.

As the temperature is lowered the absorption bands become narrower. At 77 K there are absorption peaks at 1.141, 1.230, 1.489, 1.758, 1.783, 2.049, 2.523, 2.578, and 2.805 eV.

Exciton energy levels are at 1.10 eV, called A, and 1.48 eV, called B, with a difference of 0.38 eV.

=== Raman spectrum ===
The Raman spectrum has four lines with wavenumbers of 25.4, 116.8, 171.4, and a double one at 232.4 and 234.5 cm^{−1}. The peak at 234.5 cm^{−1} is due to E^{1}_{2g} mode, especially in nanolayers, but the thicker forms and the bulk has the second peak at 232.4 cm^{−1} also perhaps due to the E^{2}_{1u} phonon mode. The peak near 171.4 cm^{−1} comes from the A_{1g}. 138 and 185 cm^{−1} peaks may be due to harmonics. B^{1}_{2g} is assigned to a peak around 291 cm^{−1} in nanolayers with few layers. The E^{1}_{2g} frequency increases as the number of layers decreases to 236.6 cm^{−1} for single layer. The A_{1g} mode lowers its frequency as the number of layers decreases, becoming 172.4 cm^{−1} for the monolayer.

=== Crystal form ===
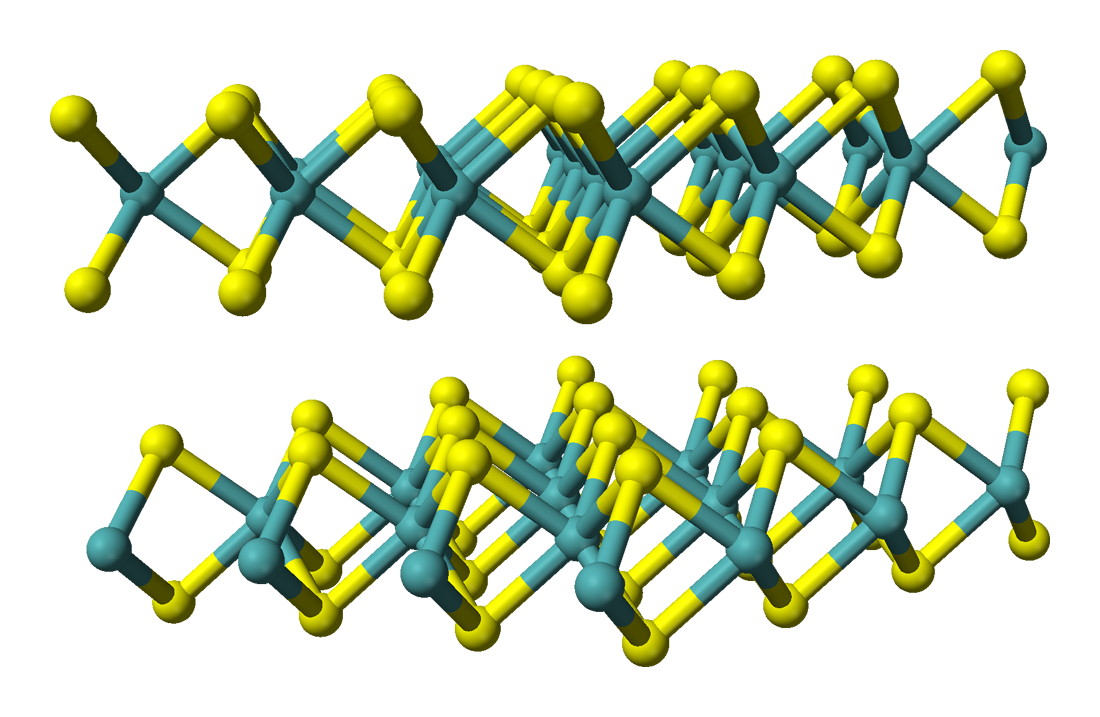
Crystal structure of hexagonal (α or 2H) MoTe_{2}

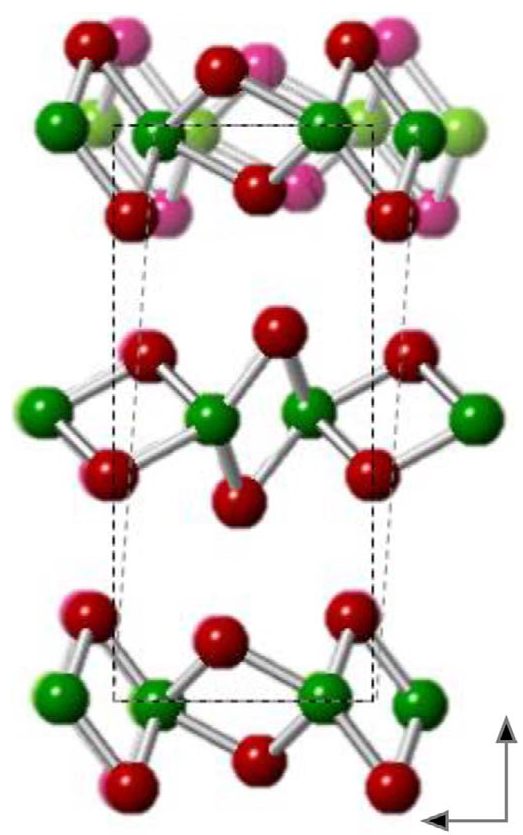
Crystal structure of orthorhombic (β', 1T' or Td) and monoclinic (β or 1T, shadow) MoTe_{2}

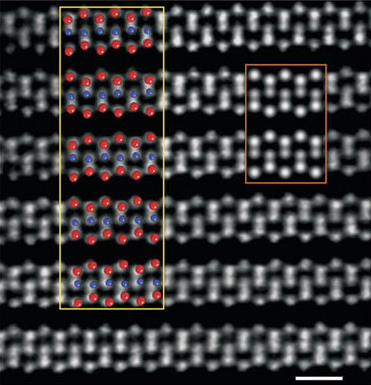
Electron micrograph of monoclinic 1T' MoTe_{2} taken along the [100] crystal axis

MoTe_{2} commonly exists in three crystalline forms with rather similar layered structures: hexagonal α (2H-MoTe_{2}), monoclinic β (1T-MoTe_{2}) and orthorhombic β' (1T'-MoTe_{2}). At room temperature it crystallises in the hexagonal system similar to molybdenum disulfide. Crystals are platy or flat. MoTe_{2} has unit cell sizes of a=3.519 Å c=13.964 Å and a specific gravity of 7.78 g·cm^{−3}. Each molybdenum atom is surrounded by six tellurium atoms in a trigonal prism with the separation of these Mo and Te atoms being 2.73 Å. This results in sublayers of molybdenum sandwiched between two sublayers of tellurium atoms, and then this three layer structure is stacked. Each layer is 6.97 Å thick. Within this layer two tellurium atoms in the same sublayer subtend an angle of 80.7°. The tellurium atoms on one sublayer are directly above those in the lower sublayer, and they subtend an angle of 83.1° at the molybdenum atom. The other Te-Mo-Te angle across sublayers is 136.0°. The distance between molybdenum atoms within a sublayer is 3.518 Å. This is the same as the distance between tellurium atoms in a sublayer. The distance between a tellurium atom in one sublayer and the atom in the other sublayer is 3.60 Å.

The layers are only bonded together with van der Waals force. The distance between tellurium atoms across the layers is 3.95 Å. The tellurium atom at the bottom of one layer is aligned with the centre of a triangle of tellurium atoms on the top of the layer below. The layers are thus in two different positions. The crystal is very easily cleaved on the plane between the three layer sheets. The sizes change with temperature, at 100 K a=3.492 Å and at 400 K is 3.53 Å. In the same range c changes from 13.67 Å to 14.32 Å due to thermal expansion. The hexagonal form is also called 2H-MoTe_{2}, where "H" stands for hexagonal, and "2" means that the layers are in two different positions. Every second layer is positioned the same.

At temperatures above 900 °C MoTe_{2} crystallises in the monoclinic 1T form (β–MoTe_{2}), with space group P2_{1}/m with unit cell sizes of a=6.33 Å b=3.469 Å and c=13.86 Å with the angle β=93°55′. The high-temperature form has rod shaped crystals. The measured density of this polymorph is 7.5 g·cm^{−3}, but in theory it should be 7.67 g·cm^{−3}. Tellurium atoms form a distorted octahedron around the molybdenum atoms. This high-temperature form, termed β–MoTe_{2} can be quenched to room temperature by rapid cooling. In this metastable state β-MoTe_{2} can survive below 500 °C. When metastable β–MoTe_{2} is cooled below −20 °C, its crystal form changes to orthorhombic. This is because the monoclinic angle c changes to 90°. This form is called β' or, misleadingly, Td.

The transition from α- to β-MoTe_{2} happens at 820 °C, but if Te is reduced by 5% the required transition temperature increases to 880 °C. K. Ueno and K. Fukushima claim that when the α form is heated in a low or high vacuum that it oxidises to form MoO_{2} and that reversible phase transitions do not take place.

In bulk, MoTe_{2} can be produced as a single crystal with difficulty, but can also be made as a powder, as a polycrystalline form, as a thin film, as a nanolayer consisting of a few TeMoTe sheets, a bilayer consisting of two sheets or as a monolayer with one sheet.

Thin nanolayer forms of α-MoTe_{2} have different symmetry depending on how many layers there are. With an odd number of layers the symmetry group is D^{1}_{3h} without inversion, but for an even number of layers, the lattice is the same if inverted and the symmetry group is D^{3}_{3d}. Nanotubes with a 20–60 nm diameter can be made by heat treating amorphous MoTe_{2}.

=== Electrical ===
N-type bulk α-MoTe_{2} has an electrical conductivity of 8.3 Ω^{−1}cm^{−1} with 5×10^{17} mobile electrons per cubic centimeter. P-type bulk MoTe_{2} has an electrical conductivity of 0.2 Ω^{−1}cm^{−1} and a hole concentration of 3.2×10^{16} cm^{−3}. The peak electrical conductivity is around 235 K, dropping off slowly with decreasing temperatures, but also reducing to a minimum around 705 K. Above 705 K conductivity increases again with temperature. Powdered MoTe_{2} has a much higher resistance.

β–MoTe_{2} has a much lower resistivity than α–MoTe_{2} by more than a thousand times with values around 0.002 Ω·cm. It is much more metallic in nature. In the β form the molybdenum atoms are closer together so that the conduction band overlaps. At room temperature resistivity is 0.000328 Ω·cm.

Orthorhombic MoTe_{2} has a resistance about 10% lower than the β form, and the resistance shows hysteresis of several degrees across the transition point around 250 K. The resistance drops roughly linearly with decreasing temperature. At 180 K resistivity is 2.52×10^{−4} Ω·cm, and at 120 mK the material becomes a superconductor. Since orthorhombic MoTe_{2} breaks spatial inversion symmetry, it exhibits ferroelectricity which can be coupled to its innate superconductivity. This coupling was leveraged to create a superconducting switch with MoTe_{2}.

At low electric current levels the voltage is proportional to the current in the α form. With high electric currents MoTe_{2} shows negative resistance, where as the current increases the voltage across the material decreases. This means there is a maximum voltage that can be applied. In the negative resistance region the current must be limited, otherwise thermal runaway will destroy the item made from the material.

The Hall constant at room temperature is around 120 cm^{3}/Coulomb for stochiometric α-MoTe_{2}. But as Te is depleted the constant drops to close to 0 for compositions in the range MoTe_{1.94} to MoTe_{1.95}.

The Seebeck coefficient is about 450 μV/K at room temperature for pure MoTe_{2}, but this drops to 0 for MoTe_{1.95}. The Seebeck coefficient increases as temperature drops.

=== Band gap ===
In the bulk α form of MoTe_{2} the material is a semiconductor with a room temperature indirect band gap of 0.88 eV and a direct band gap of 1.02 eV. If instead of bulk forms, nanolayers are measured, the indirect band gap increases as the number of layers is reduced. α-MoTe_{2} changes from an indirect to a direct band gap material in very thin slices. It is a direct bandgap material when it is one or two layers (monolayer or bilayer).

The band gap is reduced for tellurium-deficient MoTe_{2} from 0.97 to 0.5. The work function is 4.1 eV.

=== Magnetism ===
α–MoTe_{2} is diamagnetic whereas β–MoTe_{2} is paramagnetic.

=== X-ray ===
X-ray photoelectron spectroscopy on clean MoTe_{2} crystal surfaces show peaks at 231 and 227.8 eV due to molybdenum 3d_{3/2} and 3d_{5/2}; with 582.9 and 572.5 due to tellurium 3d_{3/2} and 3d_{5/2} electrons.

The X-ray K absorption edge occurs at 618.41±0.04 X units compared to molybdenum metal at 618.46 xu.

=== Microscopy ===
Atomic force microscopy (AFM) of the van der Waals surface of α-MoTe_{2} shows alternating rows of smooth balls, which are the tellurium atoms. AFM images are often done on a silica (SiO_{2}) surface on silicon. A monolayer of α-MoTe_{2} has its surface 0.9 nm above the silica, and each extra layer of α-MoTe_{2} adds 0.7 nm.

Scanning tunneling microscopy (STM) of α-MoTe_{2} reveals a hexagonal grid like chicken wire, where the molybdenum atoms are contributing to the current. Higher bias voltages are required to get an image, either over 0.5 V or below −0.3 V.

β-MoTe_{2} surfaces examined with scanning tunneling microscopy can show either a pattern of tellurium atoms or a pattern of molybdenum atoms on different parts. When the scanning tip is further from the surface only tellurium atoms are visible. This is explained by the d_{z^{2}} orbitals from molybdenum penetrating up through the surface layer of tellurium. The molybdenum can supply a much bigger current than tellurium. But at greater distance only the p orbital from tellurium can be detected. Lower voltages than used for α form still produce atomic images.

Friction force microscopy (FFM) has been used to get a slip-stick image at a resolution below that of the unit cell.

=== Thermal ===
Heat in α-MoTe_{2} is due to vibrations of the atoms. These vibrations can be resolved into phonons in which the atoms move backwards and forwards in different ways. For a monolayer twisting of the tellurium atoms within the plane is termed E″, a scissoring action where tellurium moves in the plane of the layer is termed E′. Where tellurium vibrates in opposite directions perpendicular to the layer out of the plane the phonon mode is A′_{1} and where the tellurium moves in the same direction opposite to the molybdenum the mode is called A″_{1}. Of these modes the first three are active in the Raman spectrum. In a bilayer there is an extra interaction between the atoms on the bottom of one layer and the atom on the top of the under layer. The mode symbols are modified with a suffix, "g" or "u". In the bulk form with many layers, the modes are called A_{1g} (corresponding to A′_{1} in the monolayer), A_{2u}, B_{1u} B_{2g}, E_{1g}, E_{1u}, E_{2g} and E_{2u}. Modes E_{1g}, E^{1}_{2g}, E^{2}_{2g}, and A_{1g} are Raman active. Modes E^{1}_{1u}, E^{2}_{1u}, A^{1}_{2u}, and A^{2}_{2u} are infrared active.

Molar heat of formation of α-MoTe_{2} is −6 kJ/mol from β-MoTe_{2}. Heat of formation of β-MoTe_{2} is −84 kJ/mol. For Mo_{3}Te_{4} it is −185 kJ/mol.

Thermal conductivity is 2 Wm^{−1}K^{−1}.

=== Pressure ===
Under pressure α-MoTe_{2} is predicted to become a semimetal between 13 and 19 GPa. The crystal form should stay the same at pressures up to 100 GPa. β-MoTe_{2} is not predicted to become more metallic under pressure.

=== Angle-resolved photoemission spectroscopy ===
MoTe_{2} exhibits topological Fermi arcs. This is evidence for a new type (type-II) of Weyl fermion that arises due to the breaking of Lorentz invariance, which does not have a counterpart in high-energy physics, which can emerge as topologically protected touching between electron and hole pockets. The topological surface states are confirmed by directly observing the surface states using bulk- and surface-sensitive angle-resolved photoemission spectroscopy.

=== Other ===
Poisson ratio V_{∞}=0.37. Monolayer relaxed ion elastic coefficients C_{11}=80 and C_{12}=21. Monolayer relaxed ion piezoelectric coefficient d_{11}=9.13.

== Reactions ==
=== Thermal and degradative processes ===
MoTe_{2} burn with a blue flame, emitting a white smoke of tellurium dioxide.

MoTe_{2} dissolves in dilute nitric acid with complete decomposition Hot hydrochloric does not attack MoTe_{2}. Concentrated sulfuric acid at 261 °C completely dissolves MoTe_{2}. Sodium hydroxide solution also attacks MoTe_{2}.

MoTe_{2} gradually oxidises in air forming molybdenum dioxide (MoO_{2}). Intermediates may include tellurites Te_{2}MoO_{7} and TeMo_{5}O_{16}. Other oxidation products include molybdenum trioxide, tellurium, and tellurium dioxide. Flakes of molybdenum ditelluride that contain many defects have lower luminescence, and absorb oxygen from the air, losing their luminescence.

When heated to high temperatures, tellurium evaporates from molybdenum ditelluride, producing the tellurium-deficient forms and then Mo_{2}Te_{3}. The vapour pressure of Te_{2} over hot MoTe_{2} is given by 10^{8.398-11790/T}. On further heating Mo_{2}Te_{3} gives off Te_{2} vapour. The partial pressure of Te_{2} is given by 10^{5.56-9879/T} where T is in K and the pressure is in bars. Molybdenum metal is left behind.

=== Epitaxial coating ===
The surface on the flat part of the hexagonal crystal (0001) is covered in tellurium and is relatively inert. Layers of tungsten disulfide and tungsten diselenide can be grown on molybdenum ditelluride by van der Waals epitaxy (vdWE). Gold also can be deposited on the cleavage surfaces of MoTe_{2}. On the α form gold tends to be isotropically deposited, but on the β form it makes elongated strips along the [010] crystal direction. Other substances that have been deposited on the crystal surface include indium selenide (InSe), cadmium sulfide (CdS), cadmium telluride (CdTe), tin disulfide (SnS_{2}), tin diselenide (SnSe_{2}), and tantalum diselenide (TaSe_{2}).

=== Exfoliation and intercalation ===
The sheets in α-MoTe_{2} can be separated and dispersed in water with a sodium cholate surfactant and sonication. It forms an olive green suspension. MoTe_{2} is hydrophobic, but the surfactant coats the surface with its lipophilic tail.

The sheets in α-MoTe_{2} react with lithium to form intercalation compounds. Up to Li_{1.6}MoTe_{2} can be formed. This material has a similar X-ray diffraction pattern to α-MoTe_{2}. Perylene tetracarboxylic anhydride also intercalates.

== Related Mo-Te phases ==
Another molybdenum telluride has formula Mo_{2}Te_{3}.

Yet another molybdenum telluride, hexamolybdenum octatelluride Mo_{6}Te_{8} forms black crystals shaped like cubes. It is formed when the elements in the correct ratio are heated together at 1000 °C for a week. It is related to the Chevrel phases. It is not superconducting.

== Potential applications ==
Potential uses for MoTe_{2} include electronics, optoelectronics or a photoelectric cell materials. Diodes have been fabricated from MoTe_{2} by baking a p-type material in bromine. The diode's current versus voltage plot shows very little current with reverse bias, an exponential region with dV/dln(j) of 1.6, and at higher voltages (>0.3V) a linear response due to resistance. When operated as a capacitor, the capacitance varies as the inverse square of the bias, and also drops for higher frequencies. Transistors have also been built from MoTe_{2}. MoTe_{2} has potential to build low power electronics. Field effect transistors (FET) have been built from a bilayer, trilayer and thicker nanolayers. An ambipolar FET has been built, and also a FET that can operate in n- or p-modes which had two top electrodes.

Because MoTe_{2} has two phases, devices can be constructed that mix the 2H semiconductor, and the 1T' metallic form.

A FET can be constructed with a thin layer of molybdenum ditelluride covered with a liquid gate composed of an ionic liquid or an electrolyte such as potassium perchlorate dissolved in polyethylene glycol. With low gate voltages below 2 volts, the device operates in an electrostatic mode, where the current from drain to source is proportional to the gate voltage. Above 2 volts the device enters an intermediate region where current does not increase. Above 3.5 volts current leaks through the gate, and electrolysis occurs intercalating potassium atoms in the MoTe_{2} layer. The potassium intercalated molybdenum ditelluride becomes superconducting below 2.8 K.

As a lubricant molybdenum ditelluride can function well in a vacuum and at temperatures up to 500 °C with a coefficient of friction below 0.1. However molybdenum disulfide has a lower friction, and molybdenum diselenide can function at higher temperatures.

Related dichalcogenides can be fabricated into fairly efficient photoelectric cells.

Potentially, stacked monolayers of indium nitride and molybdenum ditelluride can result in improved properties for photovoltaics, including lower refractive index, and greater absorbance.

Cadmium telluride solar cells are often deposited on a backplate of molybdenum. Molybdenum ditelluride can form at the contact, and if this is n-type it will degrade the performance of the solar cell.

Small pieces of nanolayers of molybdenum ditelluride can be mixed in and dispersed in molten pewter without reacting, and it causes a doubling of the stiffness of the resultant composite.

Molybdenum ditelluride has been used as a substrate for examining proteins with an atomic force microscope. It is superior because the protein sticks harder than with more traditional materials such as mica.

β–MoTe_{2} is a comparatively good hydrogen evolution electrocatalyst showing even in unsupported form and without any additional nanostructuring a Tafel slope of 78 mV/dec. The semiconducting polymorph of α–MoTe_{2} was found inactive for HER. The superior activity was attributed to higher conductivity of β–MoTe_{2} phase.

Recent work has shown that electrodes covered with β–MoTe_{2} demonstrated an increase in the amount of hydrogen gas produced during the electrolysis when a specific pattern of high-current pulses was applied. By optimising the pulses of current through the acidic electrolyte, the authors could reduce the overpotential needed for hydrogen evolution by nearly 50% when compared with the original non-activated material.

Few-layered metallic form 1T'-MoTe_{2} (β–MoTe_{2}) enhance SERS signal and therefore, some lipophilic markers (β–sitosterol) of coronary artery and cardiovascular diseases can be selectively detected at the surface of the few-layered films.
