= Tantalum diselenide =

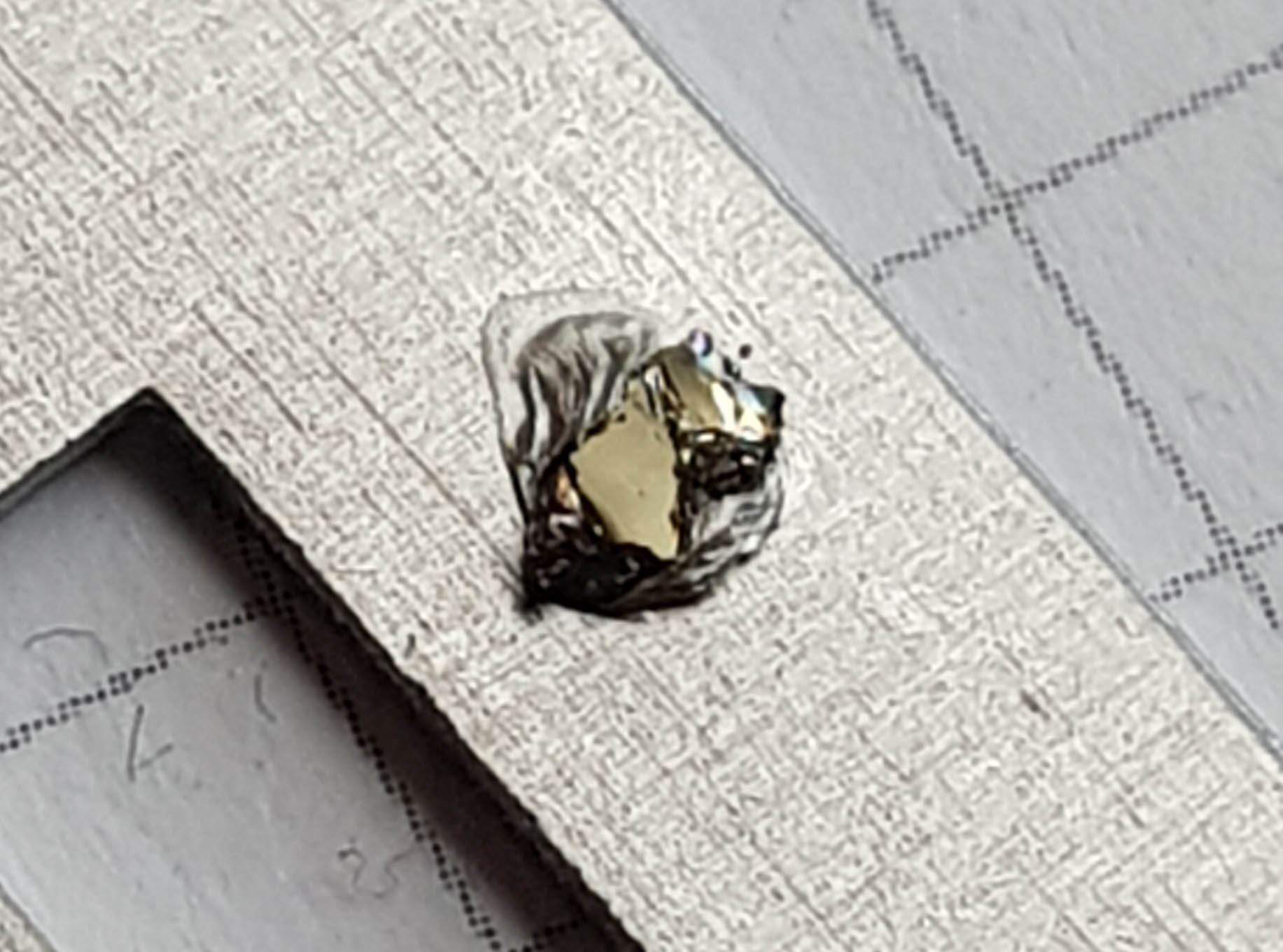
- Tantalum diselenide

Names
- IUPAC name Tantalum diselenide
- Other names Tantalum(IV) diselenide Tantalum selenide

Identifiers
CAS Number	12039-55-3
3D model (JSmol)	Interactive image
ChemSpider	74781
ECHA InfoCard	100.031.713
EC Number	234-898-2
PubChem CID	82873
CompTox Dashboard (EPA)	DTXSID6065210
- InChI: InChI=1S/2Se.Ta Key: IYJABVNLJXJBTP-UHFFFAOYSA-N
- SMILES: [Se]=[Ta]=[Se]

Properties
Chemical formula	Se_{2}Ta
Molar mass	338.890 g·mol^{−1}
Appearance	Silverish/goldish solid

Structure
Lattice constant	a = 0.343 nm (2H), 0.348 nm (1T), c = 1.27 nm (2H), 0.627 nm (1T)

Related compounds
Other anions	Tantalum ditelluride Tantalum disulfide
Other cations	Molybdenum diselenide Niobium diselenide Tungsten diselenide
- Except where otherwise noted, data are given for materials in their standard state (at 25 °C [77 °F], 100 kPa). verify (what is ?) Infobox references

Tantalum diselenide is a compound made with tantalum and selenium atoms, with chemical formula TaSe_{2}, which belongs to the family of transition metal dichalcogenides. In contrast to molybdenum disulfide (MoS_{2}) or rhenium disulfide (ReS_{2}), tantalum diselenide does not occur spontaneously in nature, but it can be synthesized. Depending on the growth parameters, different types of crystal structures can be stabilized.

In the 2010s, interest in this compound has risen due to its ability to show a charge density wave (CDW), which depends on the crystal structure, up to 600 K (327 °C), while other transition metal dichalcogenides normally need to be cooled down to hundreds of kelvins or even below to observe the same capability.

== Structure ==
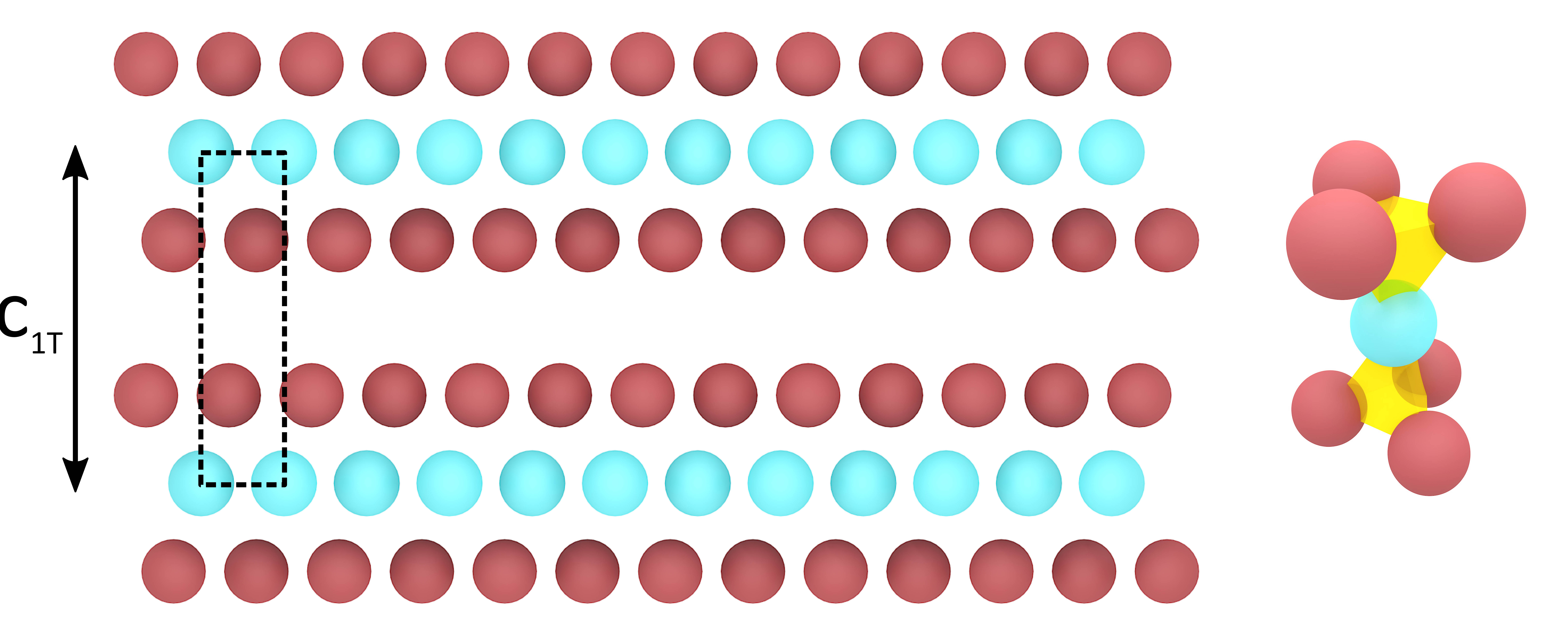
On the left, how tantalum and selenium atoms are stacked in the 1T phase. On the right, how selenium atoms are bounded to the central tantalum atom. Red is selenium while light blue is tantalum.

As other TMDs, TaSe_{2} is a layered compound, with a central tantalum hexagonal lattice sandwiched between two layers of selenium atoms, still with a hexagonal structure. Differently with respect to other 2D materials such as graphene, which is atomically thin, TMDs are composed by trilayers of atoms strongly bounded to each others, stacked above other trilayers and kept together through Van der Waals forces. TMDs can be easily exfoliated.

The most studied crystal structures of TaSe_{2} are the 1T and 2H phases that feature, respectively, octahedral and trigonal prismatic symmetries. However, it is also possible to synthesize the 3R phase or the 1H phase.

=== 1T phase ===
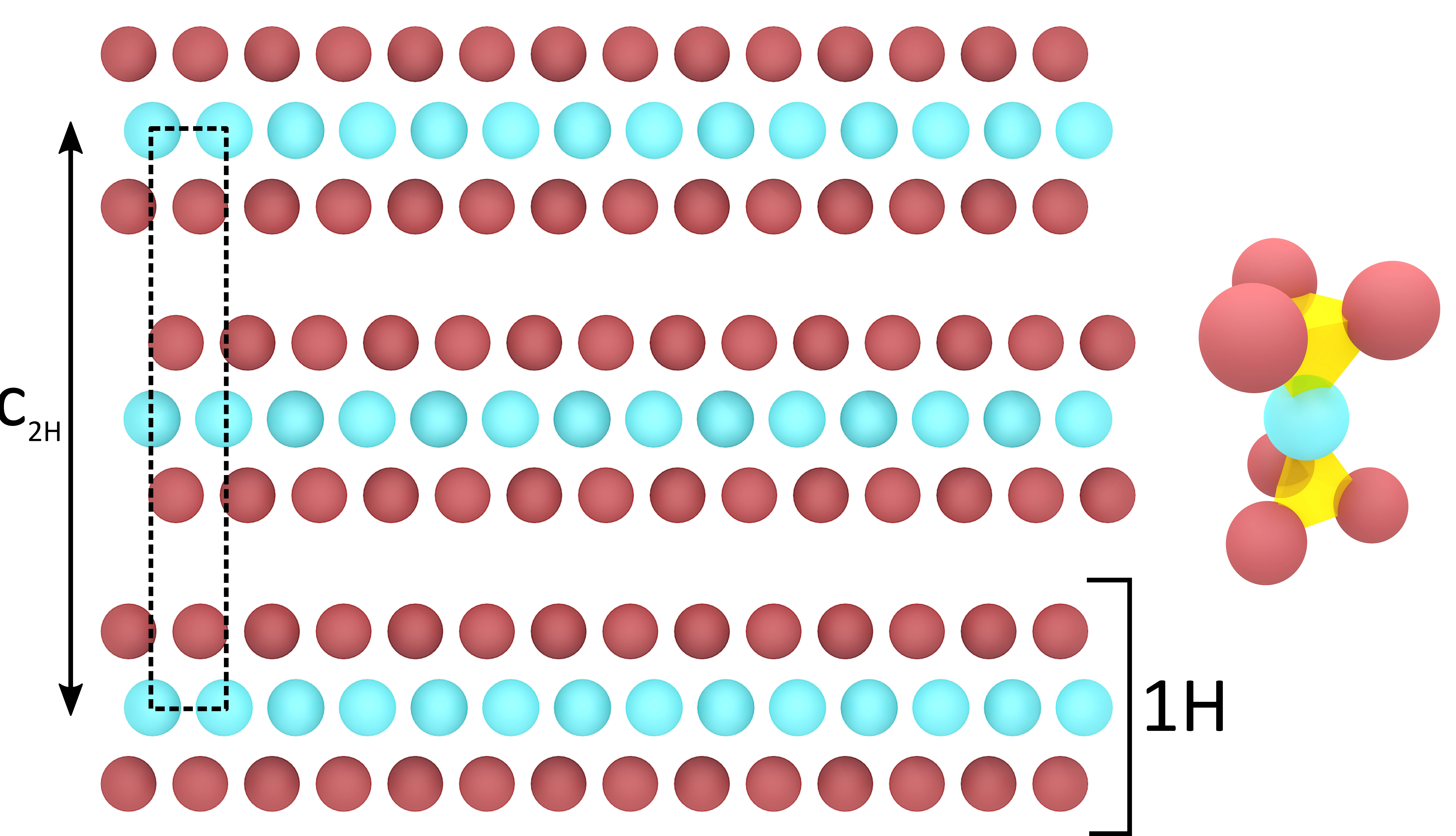
On the left, how tantalum and selenium atoms are stacked in the 2H phase. On the right, how selenium atoms are bounded to the central tantalum atom. Red is selenium while light blue is tantalum.

In the 1T phase, selenium atoms show an octahedral symmetry and the relative orientation of the selenium atoms in the topmost and bottommost layers is opposed. On a macroscopic scale, the sample shows a gold colour. The lattice parameters are a = b = 3.48 Å, while c = 0.627 nm. Depending on the temperature, it shows different types of charge density waves (CDW): an incommensurate CDW (ICDW) between 473 and 600 K (200–327 °C) and a commensurate CDW (CCDW) below 473 K (200 °C). In the commensurate CDW, the resulting superlattice shows a √13 × √13 reconstruction often referred to as star of David (SOD), with respect to the lattice parameter (a = b) of non distorted TaSe_{2} (above 600 K (327 °C)). Film thickness can influence as well the CDW transition temperature: the thinner the film, the lower the transition temperature from ICDW to CCDW.

In the 1T phase the single trilayers are stacked always in the same geometry, as shown in the corresponding image.

=== 2H phase ===
The 2H phase is based on a configuration of selenium atoms characterized by a trigonal prismatic symmetry and an equal relative orientation in the topmost and bottommost layers. The lattice parameters are a = b = 3.43 Å, while c = 1.27 nm. Depending on the temperature, it shows different types of charge density wave: an incommensurate CDW (ICDW) between 90 and 122 K (−183.2 – −151.2 °C) and a commensurate CDW (CCDW) below 90 K (−183.2 °C). The lattice distortion below 90 K (−183.2 °C) gives rise to a CCDW that makes a 3 × 3 reconstruction with respect to the non-distorted lattice parameter (a = b) of 2H-TaSe_{2} (above 122 K (−151 °C)).

In the 2H phase the single trilayers are stacked one opposed to others, as shown in the relative image. Through molecular beam epitaxy it is possible to grow one single trilayer of 2H-TaSe_{2}, also known as 1H phase. Basically, the 2H phase can be seen as the stacking of 1H phase with opposed relative orientation with respect to each others.

In the 1H phase the ICDW transition temperature is raised to 130 K (−143 °C).

== Properties ==
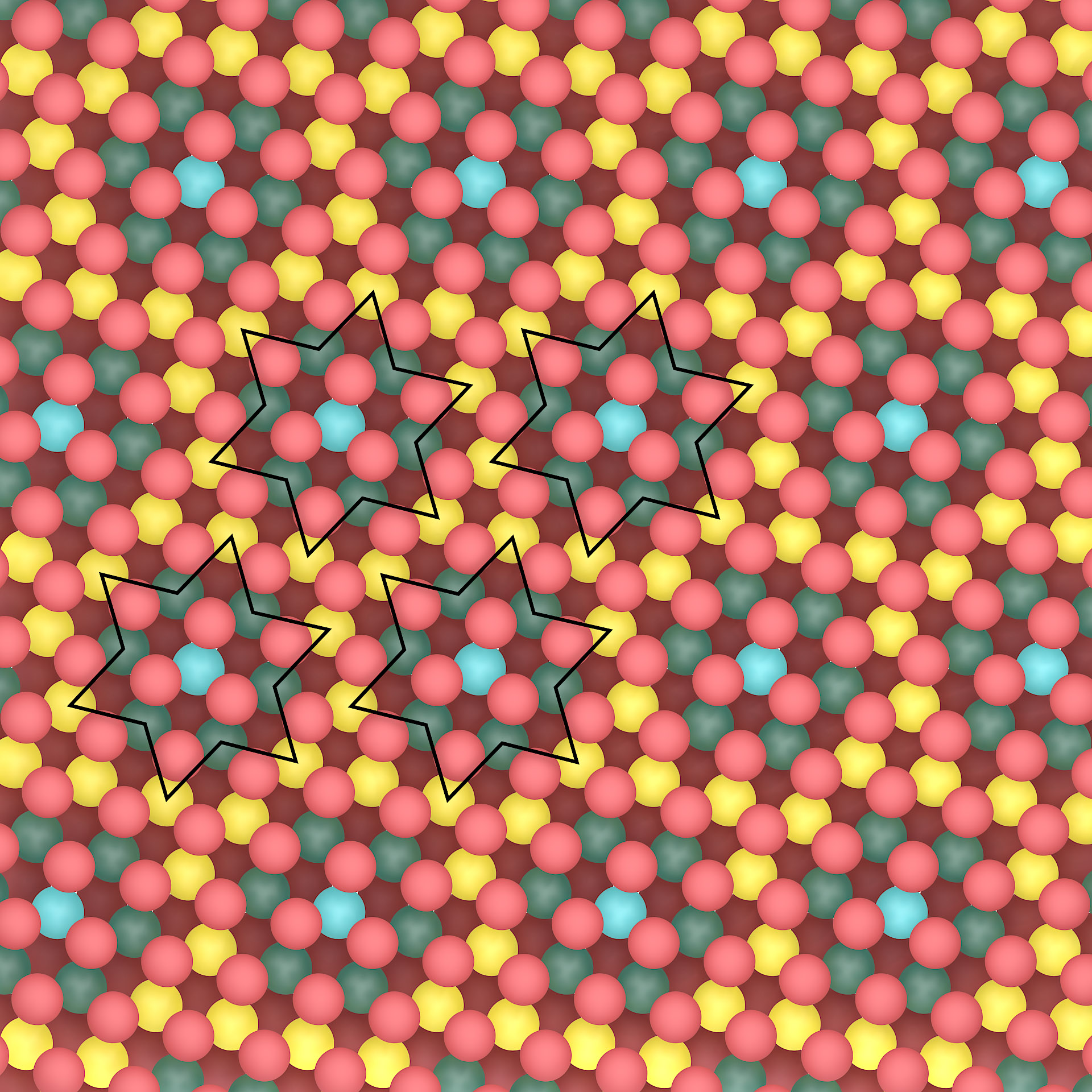
Charge Density Wave (star of David reconstruction) scheme for 1T tantalum diselenide. Red is selenium, while in light blue is tantalum in A site, green is tantalum in B site and yellow is tantalum in C site.

=== Electric and Magnetic ===
TaSe_{2} exhibits different properties according to the polytype (2H or 1T), even if the chemical composition remains unchanged.

==== 1T phase ====
The resistivity at low temperature is similar to that of a metal, but it starts decreasing at higher temperatures. A peak is exhibited at approximately 473 K (200 °C), which resembles the behavior of semiconductors. 1T phase has almost two orders of magnitude higher resistivity than to the 2H phase.

The magnetic susceptibility of the 1T phases has no peaks at low temperature and remains always nearly constant until 473 K (200 °C) is reached (ICDW temperature transition), when it jumps to slightly higher values. 1T phase is diamagnetic.

==== 2H phase ====
Resistivity linearly depends on the temperature when the latter exceeds 110 K (−163 °C). On the opposite, below this threshold it shows a non-linear behaviour. This abrupt variation of R(T) at 110 K (−163 °C) might be related to the formation of some kinds of magnetic ordering in TaSe_{2}: ordered spins scatter electrons in a less efficient way. This increases electrons mobility and yields a faster drop in resistivity than that ideally corresponding to a linear trend.

The magnetic susceptibility of the 2H polytype slightly depends on the temperature and peaks in the range 110–120 K (−163 – −153 °C). The trend is linearly ascending or descending below and above 110 K (−163 °C), respectively. This maximum in the 2H phases is related to the formation of the CCDW at 120 K (−153 °C). The 2H phase is Pauli paramagnetic.

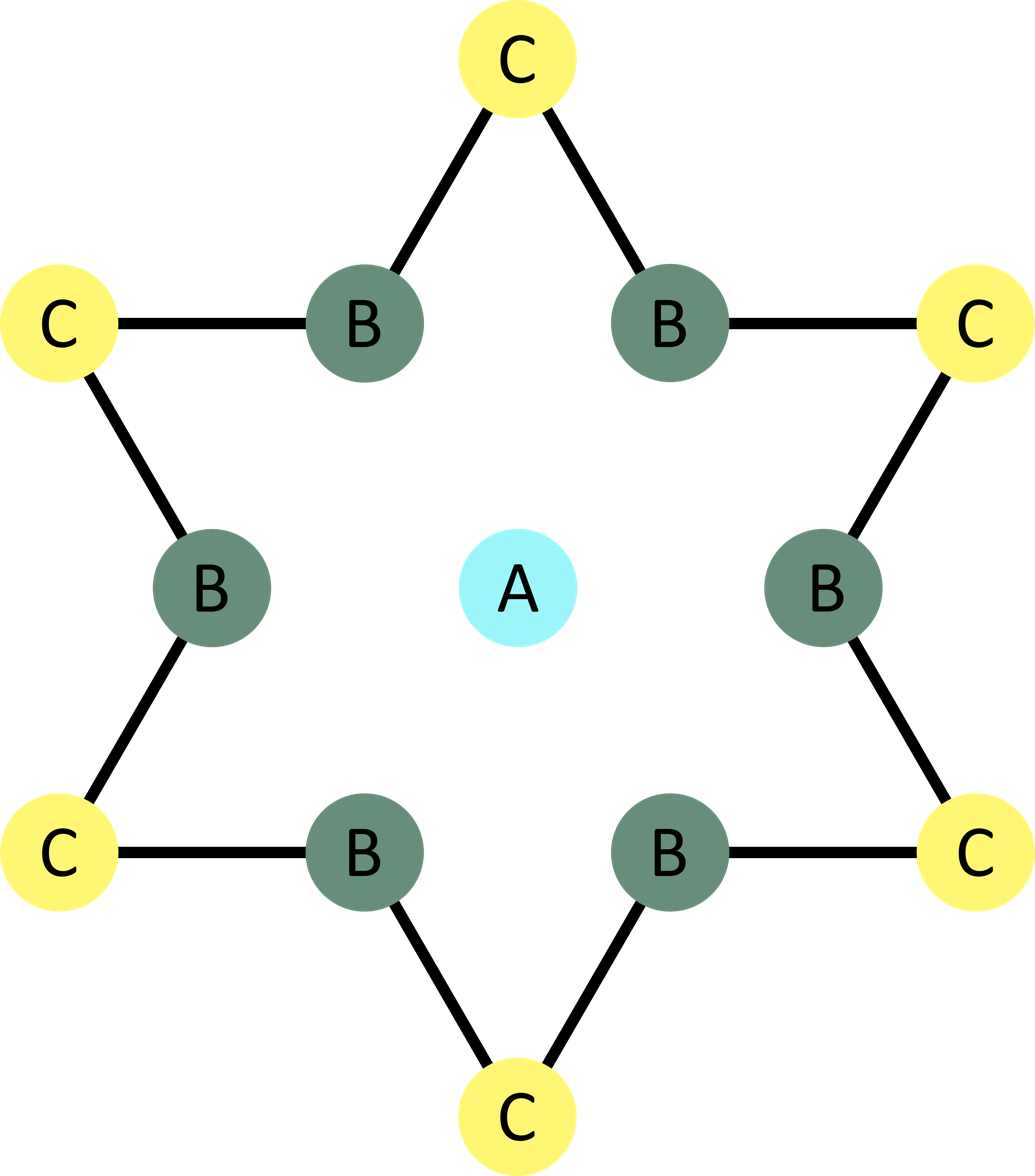
Colored scheme of the disposition of tantalum atoms in the 1T tantalum diselenide charge density wave depending on their site.

The Hall coefficient R_{H} is almost independent of the temperature above 120 K (−153 °C), a threshold below which it instead starts to drop to eventually reach a value of zero at 90 K (−183.2 °C). In the range between 4 and 90 K (−269 – −183 °C), the coefficient R_{H} is negative, its minimum being experienced at approximately 35 K (−238.2 °C).

=== Electronic ===
==== 1T phase ====
Bulk 1T-TaSe_{2} is metallic, while single monolayer (trilayer Se–Ta–Se in octahedral symmetry) is observed to be insulating with a band gap of 0.2 eV, in contrast with theoretical calculation which expected to be metallic as the bulk.

==== 2H phase ====
Bulk 2H-TaSe_{2} is metallic and so the single monolayer (trilayer Se–Ta–Se in trigonal prismatic symmetry), which is also known as the 1H phase.

=== Optical ===
Investigating the non-linear refractive index of tantalum diselenide can be pursued preparing atomically thin flakes of TaSe_{2} with the liquid phase exfoliation method. Since this technique requires using alcohol, the refractive index of tantalum diselenide can be retrieved through Kerr's law: n = n_{0} + n_{2}I, where n_{0} = 1.37 represents the linear refractive index of ethanol, n_{2} is the non-linear refractive index of TaSe_{2} and I is the incident intensity of the laser beam. Using different light wavelengths, in particular λ = 532 nm and λ = 671 nm, it is possible to measure both n_{2} and χ^{(3)}, the third order nonlinear susceptibility.

Both these quantities depend on I because the higher the intensity of the laser, the higher the samples are heated up, which results in a variation of the refractive index.

For λ = 532 nm, n_{2} = 8×10^{−7} cm^{2}/W and χ^{(3)} = 1.37×10^{−7} (e.s.u.).

For λ = 671 nm, n_{2} = 3.3×10^{−7} cm^{2}/W and χ^{(3)} = 1.58×10^{−7} (e.s.u.).

=== Superconductivity ===
Bulk 2H-TaSe_{2} has been demonstrated to be superconductive below a temperature of 0.14 K (−273.01 °C). However, the single monolayer (1H phase) can be associated with a critical temperature increased by an increment that can range up to 1 K (−272.15 °C).

Despite the 1T phase typically does not show any superconductive behaviour, formation of TaSe_{2−x}Te_{x} compound is possible through doping with tellurium atoms. The former compound superconductive character depends on the fraction of tellurium (x can vary in the range 0 < x < 2). The superconductive state arises when the fraction of Te ranges within 0.5 < x < 1.3: the optimal configuration is achieved at x = 0.6 and in correspondence of a critical temperature T_{c} = 1.6 K (−271.55 °C). In the optimal configuration, the CDW is totally suppressed by the presence of tellurium.

=== Lubricant ===
Opposite to MoS_{2}, which is largely employed as a lubricant in many different mechanical application, TaSe_{2} has not shown the same properties, with an average friction coefficient of 0.15. Under friction tests, like the Barker pendulum, it shows an initial friction coefficient of 0.2 to 0.3, which quickly increases to larger values as the number of oscillations of the pendulum increases (while for MoS_{2} it is almost constant during all the oscillations.)

== Synthesis ==
There are different methods in order to synthesize tantalum diselenide: depending on the growth parameter, different types of polytype can be stabilized.

=== Chemical Vapor Transport ===
In general, TMDs can be synthesized through a chemical vapor transport technique accordingly to the following chemical equation:

(n−1)/n M + 1/n MCl_{5} + 2 X → MX_{2} + 5/2n Cl_{2}

where M is the chosen transition metal (Ta, Mo, etc.) and X represents the chosen chalcogen element (Se, Te, S). The parameter n, which governs the crystal growth, can vary between 3 and 50, and can be selected appropriately so that the crystal growth is optimized. During such growth, which might last for 2 to 7 days, the temperature is initially increased within a range between T_{h} = 600–900 °C (873–1,173 K). Then, it is cooled down to T_{c} = 530–800 °C (803–1,073 K). After the growth completion, the crystals are cooled down to room temperature. Depending on the value of T_{c}, either the 2H or the 1T phase can be stabilized: in particular, using tantalum and selenium with T_{c} < 800 °C (1,070 K), only the 2H phase is stabilized. For the 1T phase, T_{c} must be larger. This allows to selectively grow the desirable phase of the chosen TMD.

=== Chemical vapor deposition ===
Using powder of TaCl_{5} and selenium as precursors, and a gold substrate, the 2H phase can be stabilized. The gold substrate has to be heated up to 930 °C (1,200 K), while TaCl_{5} and Se can be heated to 650 °C (923 K) and 300 °C (573 K), respectively. Argon and hydrogen gases are used as carriers. Once the growth is complete, the sample is cooled down to room temperature.

=== Mechanical exfoliation ===
Since the single trilayers are kept together only by weak Van der Waals forces, atomically thin layers of tantalum diselenide can be easily separated by using scotch/carbon tape on the bulk TaSe_{2} crystals. With this method it is possible to isolate few layers (or even a single layer) of TaSe_{2}. Then, the isolated layers can be deposited above other substrates, such as SiO_{2}, for further characterizations.

=== Molecular Beam Epitaxy ===
Pure tantalum is directly sublimated on a bilayer of graphene inside a selenium atmosphere. Depending on the temperature of the substrate T_{s} (graphene bilayer), the 1T or the 2H phase can be stabilized: in particular, if T_{s} = 450 °C (723 K) the 2H is favoured, while at T_{s} = 560 °C (833 K) the 1T is stabilized. This growth method is suitable only for atomically thin/few layers, but not for bulk crystals.

=== Liquid Phase Exfoliation ===
Bulk crystals of TaSe_{2} (or any other TMDs) are put in a solution of pure ethanol. The mixture is then sonicated in an ultrasonic device with a power of at least 450 W for 15 hours. In this way it is possible to overcome the Van der Waals forces that keep the single monolayers of TaSe_{2} together, resulting in the formation of atomically thin flakes of tantalum diselenide.

== Research ==
=== Optoelectronics ===
Since 2H TaSe_{2} has been found to feature very large optical absorption and emission of light at approximately 532 nm, it might be used for the development of new devices. In particular, the possibility of transferring energy between TaSe_{2} and other TMDs, especially MoS_{2}, has been proved. This process can be accomplished in a non-radiative resonant way by exploiting the large coupling between the TaSe_{2} emission and the excitonic absorption of TMDs.

Moreover, it is a promising material that may be used for the injection of hot carriers in semiconducting materials and other non-metallic TMDs due to the high lifetime of the generated photoelectrons.

=== All-optical switch and transferring of information ===
Exploiting the dependence of the non linear effects of TaSe_{2} by the intensity I of the incident laser beam, it is possible to build an all-optical switch by means of two lasers which operate at different wavelengths and intensities. In particular, a high-intensity laser at λ_{2} = 671 nm is used to modulate a low-intensity signal at λ_{2} = 532 nm. Since there is a minimum value of I in order to trigger the non-linear effects, the low intensity signal cannot excite alone. On the contrary, when the high-intensity beam (λ_{1}) is coupled with the low intensity signal (λ_{2}), non-linear effects at both λ_{1} and λ_{2} arise. So, it is possible to trigger the non-linear effects on the low-intensity signal (λ_{2}) by operating on the high-intensity one (λ_{1}).

Exploiting the coupling between λ_{1} and λ_{2} enables transferring information from the high-intensity beam to the low-intensity one. With this method, the delay time for transferring the information from λ_{1} to λ_{2} is around 0.6 seconds

=== Spin-orbit torque devices ===
Usually spin-orbit torque and spin to charge devices are built by interfacing a ferromagnetic layer with a bulk heavy transition metal, such as platinum. However, these effects take mainly place at the interface rather than in the platinum bulk, which introduces heat dissipation due to ohmic losses. Theoretical and DFT simulations suggest that interfacing a 1T-TaSe_{2} monolayer with cobalt might lead to higher performances with respect to the usual platinum-based devices.

Recent experiments showed that the spin-orbit scattering length of TaSe_{2} is around L_{so} = 17 nm, which is highly comparable with the one of platinum, L_{so} = 12 nm. This suggests the possible implementation of tantalum diselenide for the development of new 2D spintronic devices based on the spin Hall effect.

=== Hydrogen evolution reaction (HER) ===
DFT and AIMD simulations suggest that the stacking of flakes of both TaSe_{2} and TaS_{2} in a disordered way could be used for the development of a new efficient and cheaper cathode that might be used for the extraction of H_{2} from other chemical compounds.

== See also ==
- Molybdenum disulfide
- Molybdenum diselenide
- Molybdenum ditelluride
- Rhenium diselenide
- Rhenium disulfide
- Tungsten diselenide
