= Molybdenum diselenide =

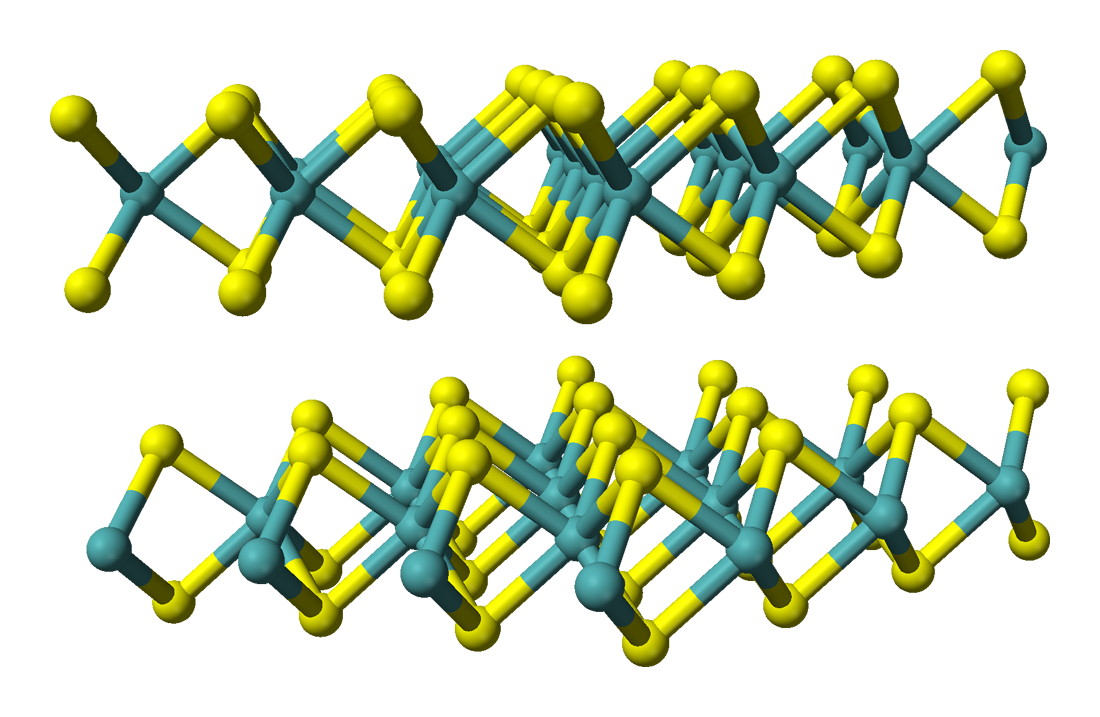
- Molybdenum diselenide

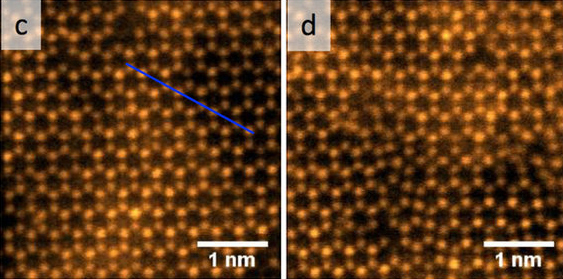
- Top-view atomic images of MoSe_{2} before and after (right) ion irradiation

Names
- IUPAC name bis(selanylidene)molybdenum
- Other names molybdenum diselenide, molybdenumdiselenide, molybdenum selenide, diselanylidenemolybdenum, molybdenum(IV) selenide

Identifiers
CAS Number	12058-18-3
3D model (JSmol)	Interactive image
ChemSpider	74797
ECHA InfoCard	100.031.831
EC Number	235-027-9
PubChem CID	82894
CompTox Dashboard (EPA)	DTXSID4065234
- InChI: InChI=1S/Mo.2Se Key: MHWZQNGIEIYAQJ-UHFFFAOYSA-N
- SMILES: [Se]=[Mo]=[Se]

Properties
Chemical formula	MoSe_{2}
Molar mass	253.86 g/mol
Appearance	crystalline solid
Density	6.90 g/cm^{3}
Melting point	>1200 °C
Band gap	~0.85 eV (indirect, bulk); ~1.5 eV (direct, monolayer)
Refractive index (n_{D})	1.4--3.4 (ultraviolet); 3.4--5.1 (visible); 4.2--4.9 (near infrared)

Structure
Crystal structure	hP6, space group P6_{3}/mmc, No 194
Lattice constant	a = 0.3283 nm, c = 1.2918 nm
Coordination geometry	Trigonal prismatic (Mo^{IV}); Pyramidal (Se^{2−})

Related compounds
Other anions	Molybdenum dioxide Molybdenum disulfide Molybdenum ditelluride Tantalum diselenide
Other cations	Tungsten diselenide
- Except where otherwise noted, data are given for materials in their standard state (at 25 °C [77 °F], 100 kPa). Infobox references

Molybdenum diselenide (MoSe_{2}) is an inorganic compound of molybdenum and selenium. Its structure is similar to that of MoS_{2}. Compounds of this category are known as transition metal dichalcogenides, abbreviated TMDCs. These compounds, as the name suggests, are made up of a transition metals and elements of group 16 on the periodic table of the elements. Compared to MoS_{2}, MoSe_{2} exhibits higher electrical conductivity.

== Structure ==
Like many TMDCs, MoSe_{2} is a layered material with strong in-plane bonding and weak out-of-plane interactions. These interactions lead to exfoliation into two-dimensional layers of single unit cell thickness.

The most common form of these TMDCs have trilayers of molybdenum sandwiched between selenium ions causing a trigonal prismatic metal bonding coordination, but it is octahedral when the compound is exfoliated. The metal ion in these compounds is surrounded by six Se^{2−} ions. The coordination geometry of the Mo is sometimes found as octahedral and trigonal prismatic.

== Synthesis ==
Synthesis of MoSe_{2} involves direct reaction of molybdenum and selenium in a sealed tube at high temperature. Chemical vapor transport with a halogen (usually bromine or iodine) is used to purify the compound at very low pressure (less than 10-6 torr) and very high temperature (600–700 °C). It has to be heated very gradually to prevent explosion due to its strong exothermic reaction. Stoichiometric layers crystallize in a hexagonal structure as the sample cools. Excess selenium can be removed by sublimation under vacuum. The synthesis reaction of MoSe_{2} is:

Mo + 2 Se → MoSe_{2}

Single-crystal-thick layers of MoSe_{2} are produced by scotch tape exfoliation from bulk crystals, by chemical vapor deposition (CVD) or molecular-beam epitaxy (MBE).

== Properties ==
The electron mobility of 2D-MoSe_{2} is significantly higher than that of 2D-MoS_{2}. 2D MoSe_{2} adopts structures reminiscent of graphene, although the latter's electron mobility is thousands of times greater still.

In contrast to graphene, monolayer MoSe_{2} has a direct band gap, suggesting applications in transistors and photodetectors. However, the band gap of multilayer MoSe_{2} is indirect.

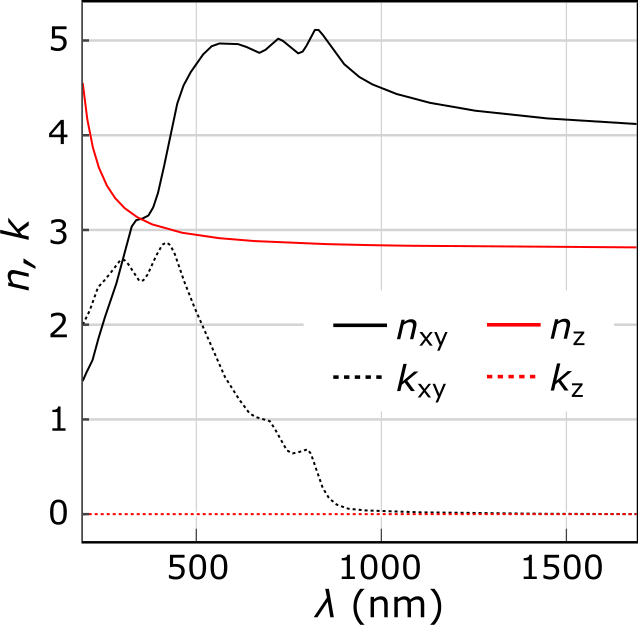
In-plane (n_{xy}) and out-of-plane (n_{z}) refractive index spectra of molybdenum diselenide with respective extinction coefficient spectra (k_{xy}, k_{z}).

Molybdenum diselenide exhibits anisotropy of the refractive index. The in-plane refractive index has exceptionally high values, extending 4 for wavelengths above 430 nm and reaching a maximum value of 5.117 for 825 nm, while the out-of-plane refractive index is near 3 in the visible and the infrared range of the spectrum. MoSe_{2} highly absorb the visible light but is transparent for the infrared.

== Natural occurrence ==
Molybdenum(IV) selenide occurs in the nature as the extremely rare mineral drysdallite.
