= Tantalum(IV) sulfide =

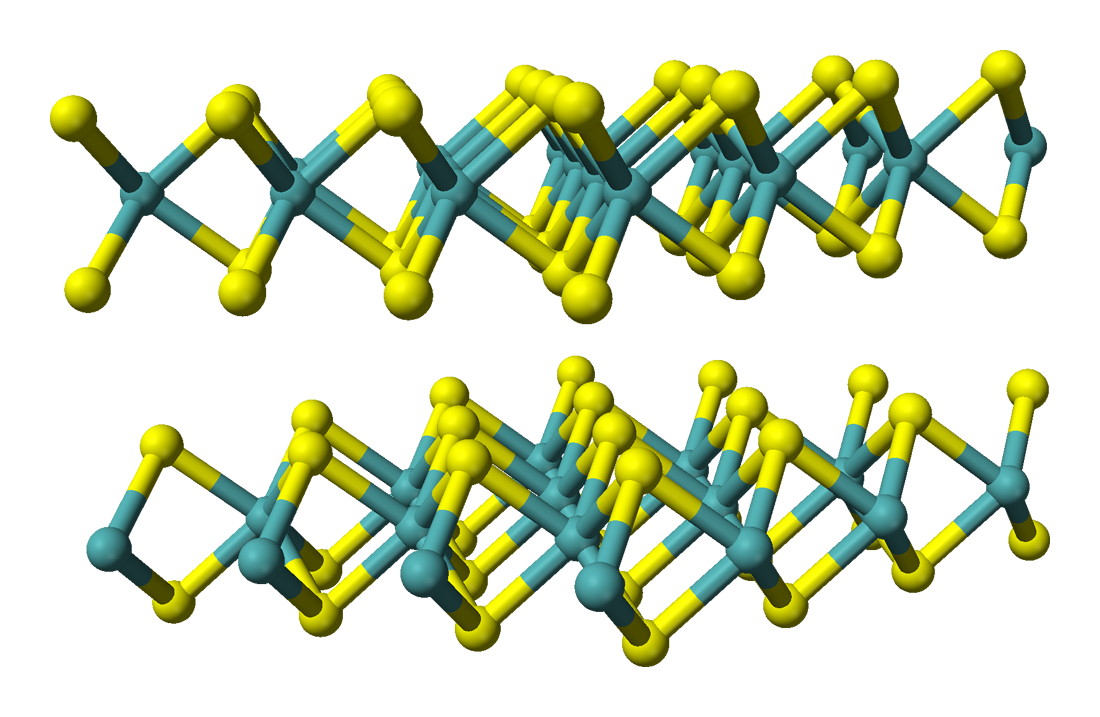
- Crystal structure showing two stacked S-Ta-S sheets

Names
- Other names tantalum disulfide

Identifiers
CAS Number	12143-72-5
3D model (JSmol)	Interactive image
ChemSpider	14344084
ECHA InfoCard	100.032.047
EC Number	235-265-3
PubChem CID	82945
CompTox Dashboard (EPA)	DTXSID6065260
- InChI: Key: FAWYJKSBSAKOFP-UHFFFAOYSA-N; InChI=1S/2S.Ta
- SMILES: S=[Ta]=S

Properties
Chemical formula	TaS_{2}
Molar mass	245.078 g/mol
Appearance	golden or black crystals, depending on polytype
Density	6.86 g/cm^{3}
Melting point	>3000 °C
Solubility in water	Insoluble

Related compounds
Other anions	Tantalum telluride Tantalum diselenide
- Except where otherwise noted, data are given for materials in their standard state (at 25 °C [77 °F], 100 kPa). verify (what is ?) Infobox references

Tantalum(IV) sulfide is an inorganic compound with the formula TaS_{2}. It is a layered compound with three-coordinate sulfide centres and trigonal prismatic or octahedral metal centres. It is structurally similar to molybdenum disulfide MoS_{2}, and numerous other transition metal dichalcogenides. Tantalum disulfide has three polymorphs 1T-TaS2, 2H-TaS2, and 3R-TaS2, representing trigonal, hexagonal, and rhombohedral respectively.

The properties of the 1T-TaS_{2} polytype have been described. In common with many other transition metal dichalcogenide (TMD) compounds, which are metallic at high temperatures, it exhibits a series of charge-density-wave (CDW) phase transitions from 550 K to 50 K. It is unusual amongst them in showing a low-temperature insulating state below 200 K, which is believed to arise from electron correlations, similar to many oxides. The insulating state is commonly attributed to a Mott state. It is also superconducting under pressure or upon doping, with a familiar dome-like phase diagram as a function of dopant, or substituted isovalent element concentration.

Metastability. 1T-TaS_{2} is unique, not only amongst TMDs but also amongst 'quantum materials' in general, in showing a metastable metallic state at low temperatures. Switching from the insulating to the metallic state can be achieved either optically or by the application of electrical pulses. The metallic state is persistent below ~20K, but its lifetime can be tuned by changing the temperature. The metastable state lifetime can also be tuned by strain. The electrically-induced switching between states is of current interest, because it can be used for ultrafast energy-efficient memory devices.

Because of the frustrated triangular arrangement of localized electrons, the material is suspected of supporting some form of quantum spin liquid state. It has been the subject of numerous studies as a host for intercalation of electron donors.

== Preparation ==
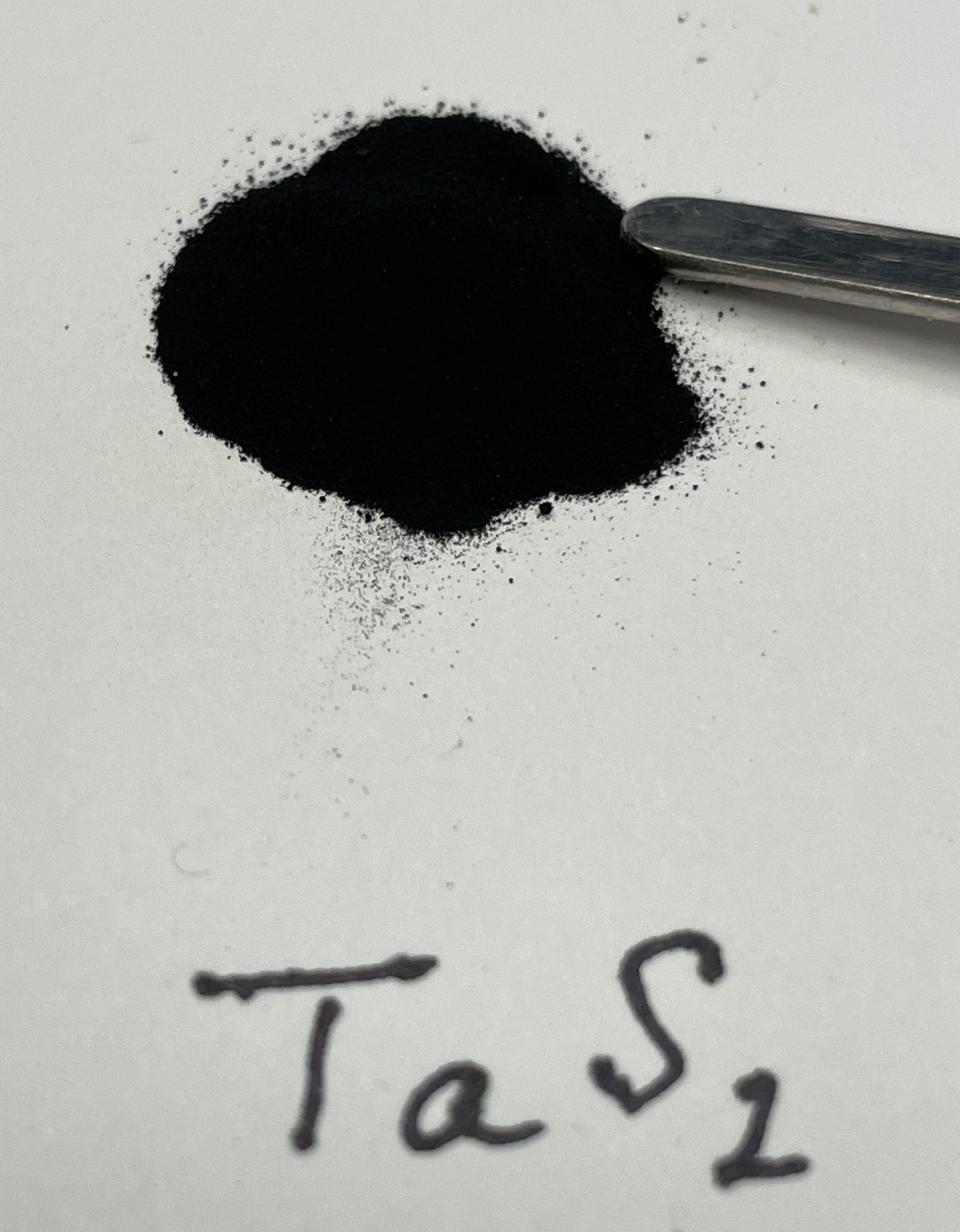
Sample polycrystalline TaS_{2}

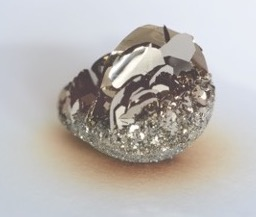
1T-TaS_{2} crystals grown by transport reaction

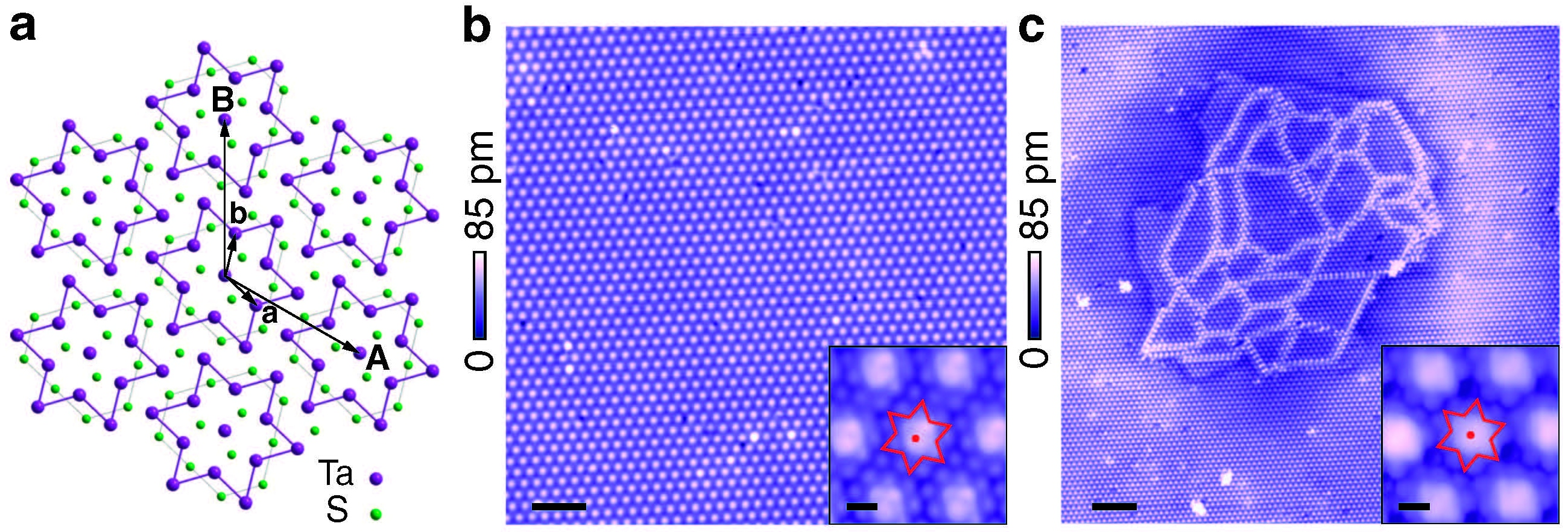
(a): Schematic of the David star pattern in 1T-TaS_{2} where green atoms are S and purple are Ta. (b) and (c) are STM images (6.5 K) before and after application of 2.8 V pulses through the STM tip. Insets show ~10 times magnified images.

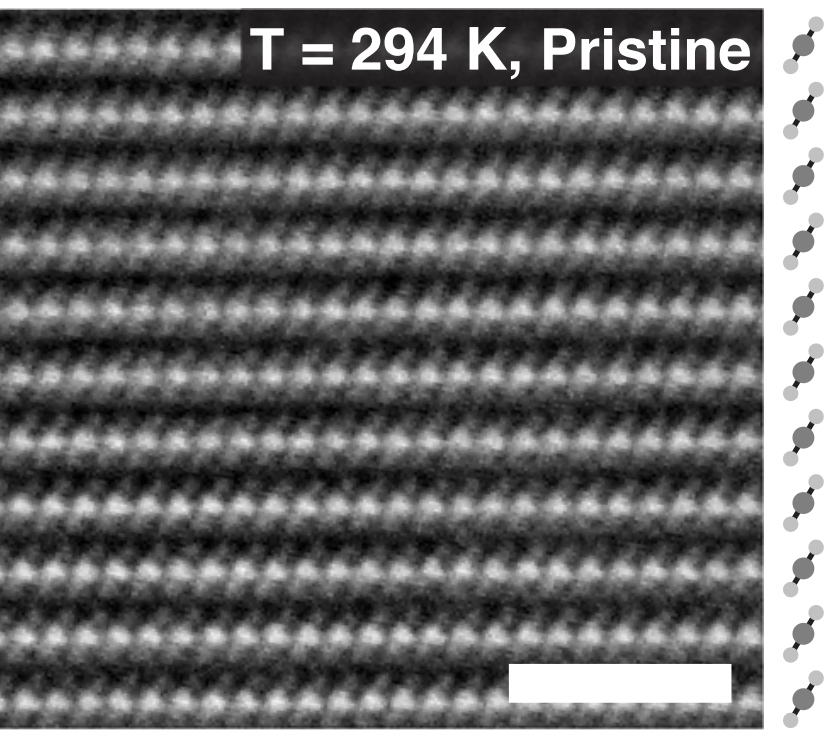
Atomic resolution image of 1T-TaS_{2} (298 K). Acquired using HAADF STEM. Scale bar 2 nm.

TaS_{2} is prepared by reaction of powdered tantalum and sulfur at ~900 °C. It is purified and crystallized by chemical vapor transport using iodine as the transporting agent:

TaS_{2} + 2 I_{2} ⇌ TaI_{4} + 2 S

It can be easily cleaved and has a characteristic golden sheen. Upon extended exposure to air, the formation of an oxide layer causes darkening of the surface. Thin films can be prepared by chemical vapour deposition and molecular beam epitaxy.

== Properties ==
Three major crystalline phases are known for TaS_{2}: trigonal 1T with one S-Ta-S sheet per unit cell, hexagonal 2H with two S-Ta-S sheets, and rhombohedral 3R with three S-Ta-S sheets per cell; 4H and 6R phases are also observed, but less frequently. These polymorphs mostly differ by the relative arrangement of the S-Ta-S sheet rather than the sheet structure.

2H-TaS_{2} is a superconductor with the bulk transition temperature T_{C} = 0.5 K, which increases to 2.2 K in flakes with a thickness of a few atomic layers. The bulk T_{C} value increases up to ~8 K at 10 GPa and then saturates with increasing pressure. In contrast, 1T-TaS_{2} starts superconducting only at ~2 GPa; as a function of pressure its T_{C} quickly rises up to 5 K at ~4 GPa and then saturates.

At ambient pressure and low temperatures 1T-TaS_{2} is a Mott insulator. Upon heating it changes to a Triclinic charge density wave (TCDW) state at T_{TCDW} ~ 220 K, to a nearly commensurate charge density wave (NCCDW) state at T_{NCCDW} ~ 280 K, to an incommensurate CDW (ICCDW) state at T_{ICCDW} ~ 350 K, and to a metallic state at T_{M} ~ 600 K.

In the CDW state the TaS_{2} lattice deforms to create a periodic Star of David pattern. Application of (e.g. 50fs) optical laser pulses or voltage pulses (~2–3 V) through electrodes or in a scanning tunneling microscope (STM) to the CDW state causes it to drop electrical resistance and creates a "mosaic" or domain state consisting of nanometer-sized domains, where both the domains and their walls exhibit metallic conductivity. This mosaic structure is metastable and gradually disappears upon heating.

== Memory devices and other potential applications ==
Switching of the material to and from the "mosaic", or domain state, by optical or electrical pulses is used for "Charge configuration memory" (CCM) devices. The distinguishing feature of such devices is that they exhibit very efficient and fast non-thermal resistance switching at low temperatures. Room temperature operation of a charge-density-wave oscillator and thermally-driven GHz modulation of the CDW state has been demonstrated.
