= Valleytronics =

Experimental area in semiconductors

Valleytronics (from valley and electronics) is an experimental area in semiconductors that exploits local extrema ("valleys") in the electronic band structure. Certain semiconductors have multiple "valleys" in the electronic band structure of the first Brillouin zone, and are known as multivalley semiconductors. Valleytronics is the technology of control over the valley degree of freedom, a local maximum/minimum on the valence/conduction band, of such multivalley semiconductors.

== Details ==
The term was coined in analogy to spintronics. While in spintronics the internal degree of freedom of spin is harnessed to store, manipulate and read out bits of information, the proposal for valleytronics is to perform similar tasks using the multiple extrema of the band structure, so that the information of 0s and 1s would be stored as different discrete values of the crystal momentum.

Valleytronics may refer to other forms of quantum manipulation of valleys in semiconductors, including quantum computation with valley-based qubits, valley blockade and other forms of quantum electronics. First experimental evidence of valley blockade predicted in Ref. (which completes the set of Coulomb charge blockade and Pauli spin blockade) has been observed in a single atom doped silicon transistor.

Several theoretical proposals and experiments were performed in a variety of systems, such as graphene, few-layer phosphorene, some transition metal dichalcogenide monolayers, diamond, bismuth, silicon, carbon nanotubes, aluminium arsenide and silicene.
