= Tantalum telluride =

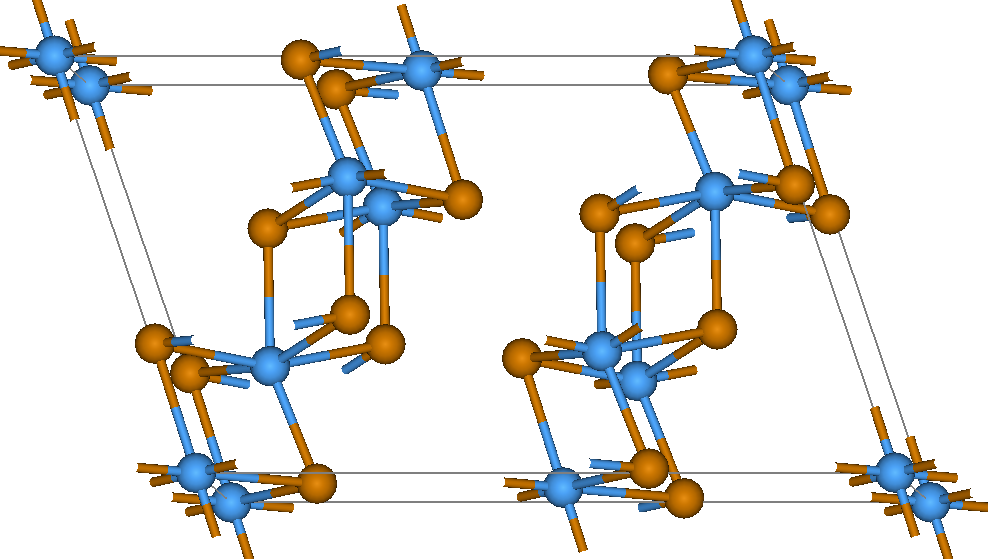

Names
- IUPAC name tantalum(IV) telluride
- Other names tantalum ditelluride tantalum telluride

Identifiers
CAS Number	12067-66-2
3D model (JSmol)	Interactive image
ChemSpider	74811
ECHA InfoCard	100.031.882
EC Number	235-083-4
PubChem CID	82911
CompTox Dashboard (EPA)	DTXSID3065241
- InChI: Key: HQZPMWBCDLCGCL-UHFFFAOYSA-N; InChI=1S/Ta.2Te
- SMILES: [Te]=[Ta]=[Te]

Properties
Chemical formula	TaTe_{2}
Molar mass	436.145 g/mol
Density	9.4 g/cm^{3}

Structure
Crystal structure	Monoclinic, mS18
Space group	C2/m, No. 12

Related compounds
Other anions	Tantalum(IV) sulfide
- Except where otherwise noted, data are given for materials in their standard state (at 25 °C [77 °F], 100 kPa). verify (what is ?) Infobox references

Tantalum telluride is a chemical compound of tantalum and tellurium. It is most commonly found as a layered transition metal dichalcogenide (TMD) with the chemical formula TaTe_{2}.

TaTe_{2} hosts structural distortions that are stable at room temperature, resulting in a distorted monoclinic structure, referred to as the 1T' phase. Below a temperature of approximately 170 K, it undergoes a charge density wave (CDW) phase transition to the low temperature (LT) phase, where double zigzag chains reconstruct into discrete "butterfly" clusters. This is accompanied by a sharp drop in electrical resistivity, distinguishing it from the metal-insulator transitions found in materials like TaS_{2}.

Tantalum also forms a tantalum rich telluride with the approximate formula Ta_{1.6}Te that is unusual in that it forms dodecagonal chalcogenide quasicrystals, a formation that cannot occur in a normal crystal because it does not result in a periodic crystal lattice.

== Preparation ==
TaTe_{2} can be synthesized by reaction of powdered tantalum and tellurium at temperatures around 800 °C. Single crystals of TaTe_{2} can be crystallized from powders via chemical vapor transport using iodine as the transporting agent, or flux zone growth. TaTe_{2} single cystals can be easily cleaved along the crystallographic ab-plane and has a characteristic grey-black metallic sheen.

== Structure ==
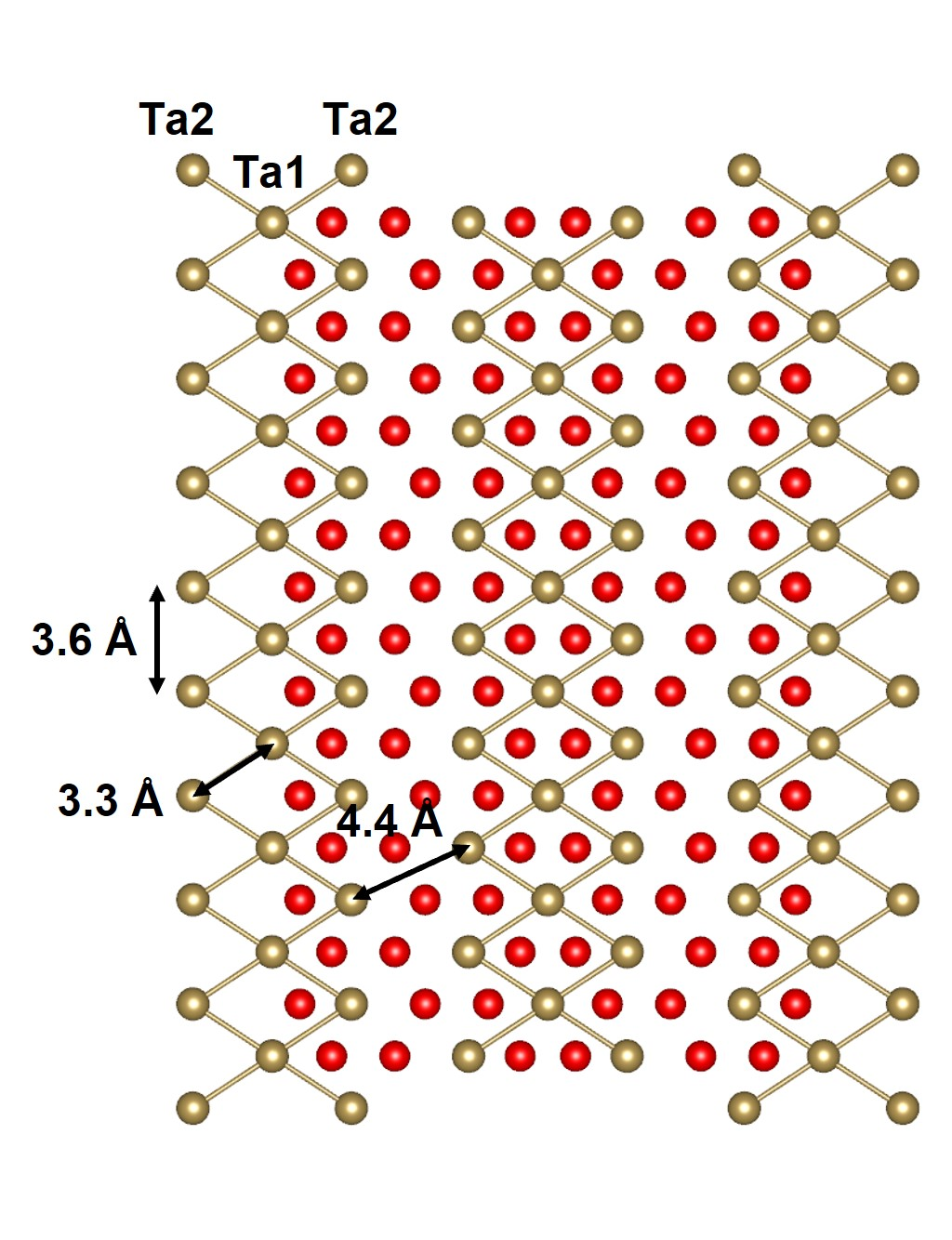
Top-view of a single Ta plane illustrating the 3 x 1 double zigzag chain superstructure in the room temperature phase of 1T'-TaTe2.

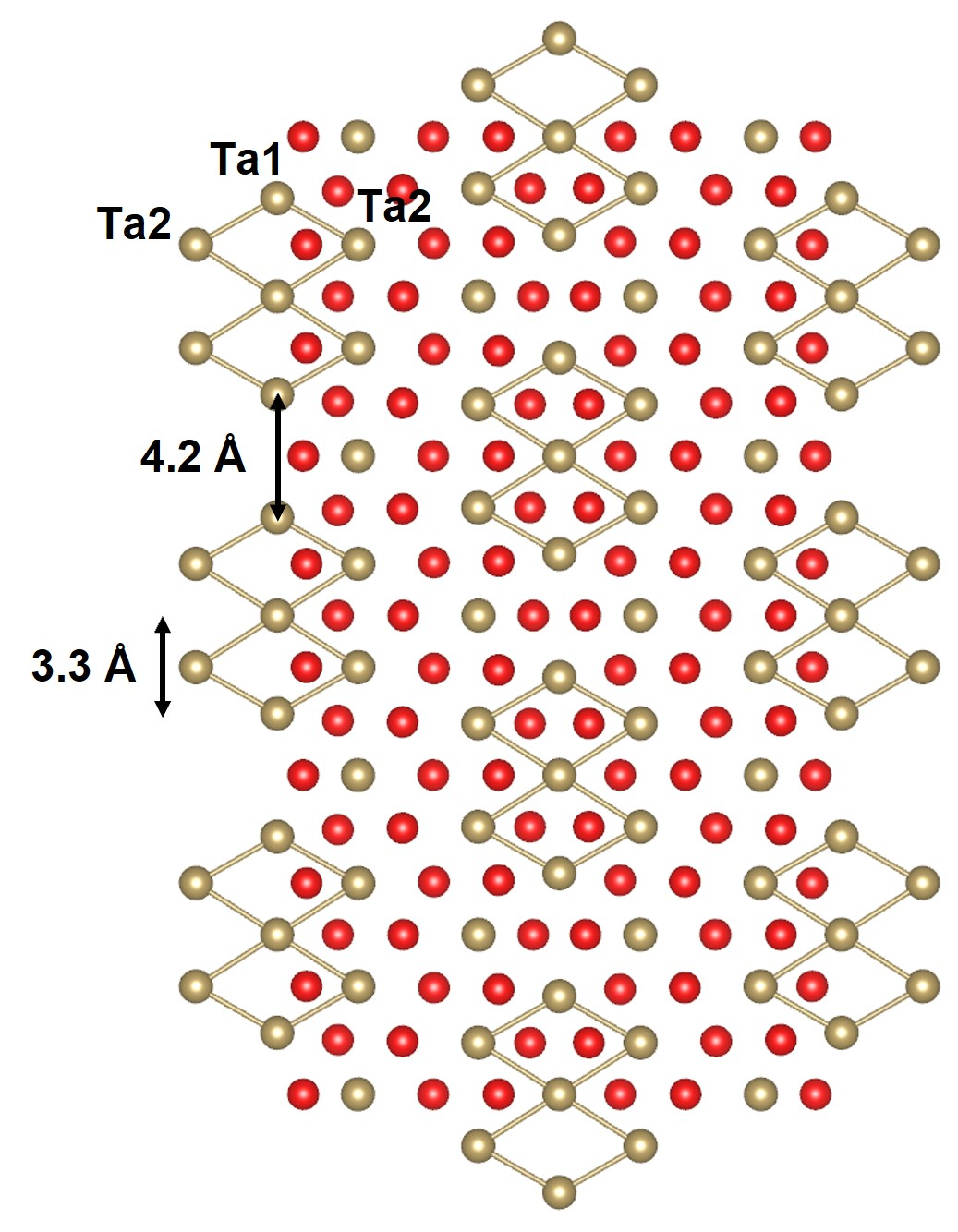
Top-view of a single Ta plane illustrating the 3 × 3 superstructure of LT-TaTe2 below the CDW transition temperature.

TaTe_{2} has a monoclinically distorted CdI_{2}-type structure (a = 19.31 Å, b = 3.651 Å, c = 9.377 Å, β = 134.22°), where Ta atoms are surrounded by six Te atoms in an octahedron. The distortion is thought to be caused by the low electronegativity of Te, leading to a weaker Ta-Te bonds and a partial charge transfer from Te to Ta.

Room Temperature (1T' phase): At room temperature, Ta atoms cluster to form an intra-layer (3 × 1) linear stripe-like order, with double zigzag chains propagating along the b-axis. This distortion (relative to a hypothetical undistorted 1T-TaTe_{2} lattice) lowers the symmetry from trigonal to monoclinic (space group C2/m), resulting in distorted octahedral coordination of the Ta atoms. The Ta atoms occupy two distinct crystallographic sites: Ta1 atoms located in the chain interior and Ta2 atoms at the chain rims. The Ta1 atoms are situated in less distorted octahedra and exhibit uniform Ta1-Ta1 distances of 3.6 Å. Conversely, the Ta2 atoms center more distorted octahedra, with Ta1-Ta2 distances of 3.3 Å. These chains are separated by a longer inter-chain Ta2-Ta2 distance of 4.4 Å. The surrounding Te sublattice forms planes of weakly interacting atoms, consistent with van der Waals or weak multicenter bonding.

Low Temperature (LT phase): Upon cooling below T_{CDW} (~170 K), the zigzag chains break apart to form discrete, periodic clusters of Ta atoms. The formation of butterfly clusters lead to an irregular octahedral environment where Ta1-Ta1 distances vary sharply (3.3 Å intra-cluster vs. 4.2 Å inter-cluster). A distinct periodic lattice distortion also emerges in the Te sublattice, where Te atoms displace toward the Ta planes to form single zigzag chains. Te-Te bond lengths shorten inside these chains to approach the covalent bond length of elemental Te, while Te-Te distances outside the chains elongate. The covalent bond character within the Te network facilitates charge delocalization, correlating with the decreased resistivity observed in this phase.

A trigonal prismatic (1H) coordination environment has been observed in monolayer films grown by molecular beam epitaxy (MBE), but has not been observed in bulk TaTe_{2}.

== Electronic and transport properties ==
The phase transition at ~170 K is classified as a CDW transition, although its mechanism differs from those observed in materials such as NbSe_{2}. The transition is driven by a periodic lattice distortion with a commensurate superstructure described by the wave vector q = (0, 1/3, 0), corresponding to the butterfly cluster formation. Theoretical calculations suggest that this transition is not driven by the Fermi surface nesting commonly found in other layered CDW materials, but rather by an instability associated with the formation of localized metal-metal bonds.

Unlike the metal-insulator transitions observed in dichalcogenides like 1T-TaS_{2}, the CDW transition in TaTe_{2} is characterized by a preservation of the metallic state down to low temperatures, with a steep decrease in resistivity around the transition temperature.

The suppression of the CDW state has been reported to lead to the emergence of superconductivity. As pressure is applied, the CDW transition temperature decreases until it is completely suppressed at a critical pressure of approximately 1.3 GPa, near which a superconducting state with an onset temperature of 0.4 K emerges.
