= Transition metal dichalcogenide monolayers =

Thin semiconductors

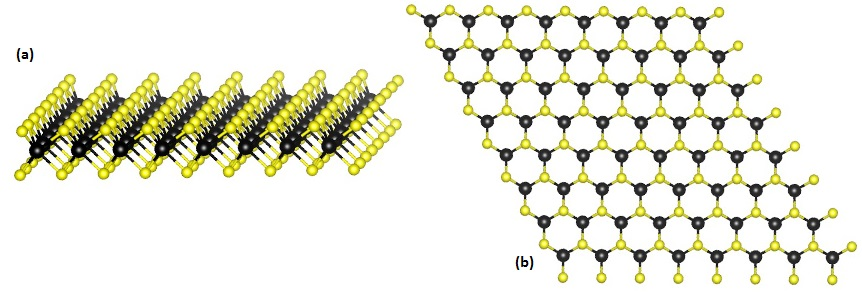
(a) Structure of a hexagonal TMD monolayer. M atoms are in black and X atoms are in yellow. (b) A hexagonal TMD monolayer seen from above.

Transition-metal dichalcogenide (TMD or TMDC) monolayers are atomically thin semiconductors of the type MX_{2}, with M a transition-metal atom (Mo, W, etc.) and X a chalcogen atom (S, Se, or Te). One layer of M atoms is sandwiched between two layers of X atoms. They are part of the large family of so-called 2D materials, named so to emphasize their extraordinary thinness. For example, a MoS_{2} monolayer is only 6.5 Å thick. The key feature of these materials is the interaction of large atoms in the 2D structure as compared with first-row transition-metal dichalcogenides, e.g., WTe_{2} exhibits anomalous giant magnetoresistance and superconductivity.

The discovery of graphene shows how new physical properties emerge when a bulk crystal of macroscopic dimensions is thinned down to one atomic layer. Like graphite, TMD bulk crystals are formed of monolayers bound to each other by van-der-Waals attraction. TMD monolayers have properties that are distinctly different from those of the semimetal graphene:

- TMD monolayers MoS_{2}, WS_{2}, MoSe_{2}, WSe_{2}, MoTe_{2} have a direct band gap, and can be used in electronics as transistors and in optics as emitters and detectors.
- The TMD monolayer crystal structure has no inversion center, which allows to access a new degree of freedom of charge carriers, namely the k-valley index, and to open up a new field of physics: valleytronics
- The strong spin–orbit coupling in TMD monolayers leads to a spin–orbit splitting of hundreds meV in the valence band and a few meV in the conduction band, which allows control of the electron spin by tuning the excitation laser photon energy and handedness.
- 2D nature and high spin–orbit coupling in TMD layers can be used as promising materials for spintronic applications.

The work on TMD monolayers is an emerging research and development field since the discovery of the direct bandgap and the potential applications in electronics and valley physics. TMDs are often combined with other 2D materials like graphene and hexagonal boron nitride to make van der Waals heterostructures. These heterostructures need to be optimized to be possibly used as building blocks for many different devices such as transistors, solar cells, LEDs, photodetectors, fuel cells, photocatalytic and sensing devices. Some of these devices are already used in everyday life and can become smaller, cheaper and more efficient by using TMD monolayers.

== Crystal structure ==
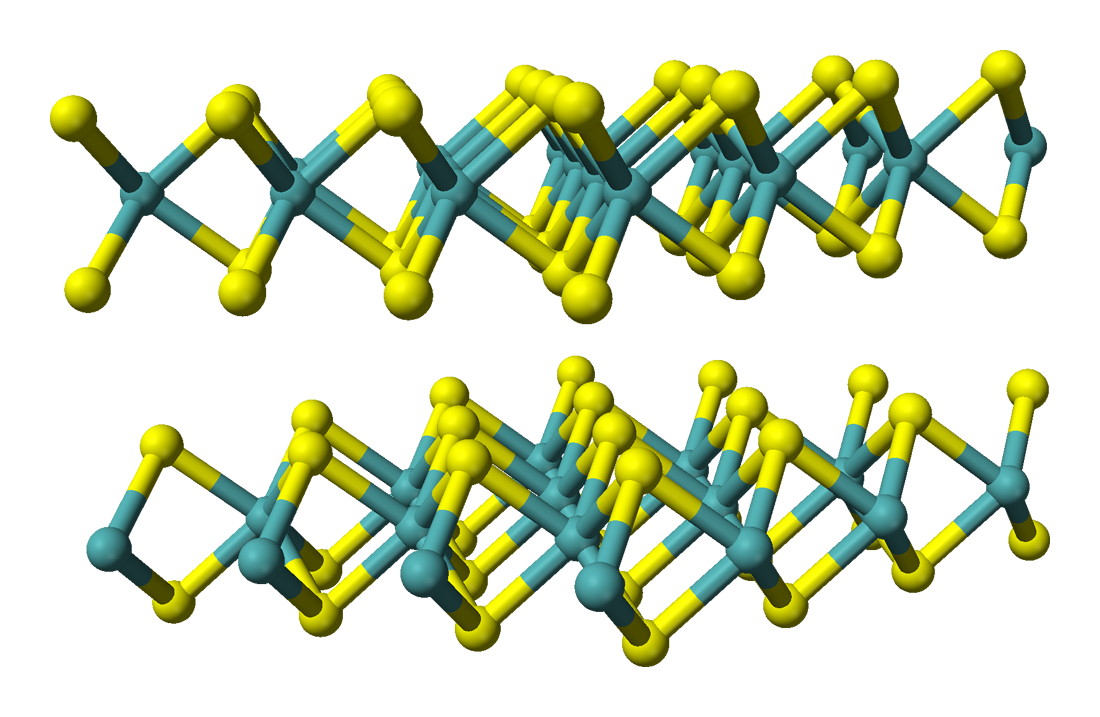
Crystal structure of TMDs

Transition-metal dichalcogenides (TMDs) are composed of three atomic planes and often two atomic species: a metal and two chalcogens. The honeycomb, hexagonal lattice has threefold symmetry and can permit mirror plane symmetry and/or inversion symmetry. In the macroscopic bulk crystal, or more precisely, for an even number of monolayers, the crystal structure has an inversion center. In the case of a monolayer (or any odd number of layers), the crystal may or may not have an inversion center.

== Broken inversion symmetry ==
Two important consequences of that are:

- nonlinear optical phenomena, such as second-harmonic generation. When the crystal is excited by a laser, the output frequency can be doubled.
- an electronic band structure with direct energy gaps, where both conduction and valence band edges are located at the non-equivalent K points (K+ and K−) of the 2D hexagonal Brillouin zone. The interband transitions in the vicinity of the K+ (or K−) point are coupled to right (or left) circular photon polarization states. These so-called valley dependent optical selection rules arise from inversion symmetry breaking. This provides a convenient method to address specific valley states (K+ or K−) by circularly polarized (right or left) optical excitation. In combination with strong spin-splitting, the spin and valley degree of freedom are coupled, enabling stable valley polarization.

These properties indicate that TMD monolayers represent a promising platform to explore spin and valley physics with the corresponding possible applications.

== Properties ==
=== Transport properties ===
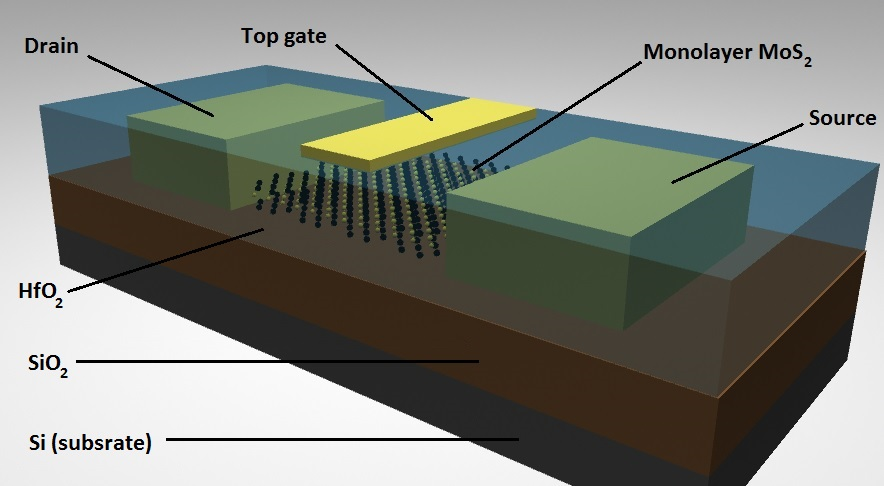
Representative scheme of the section of a field effect transistor based on a monolayer of MoS_{2}

At submicron scales, 3D materials no longer have the same behavior as their 2D form, which can be an advantage. For example, graphene has a very high carrier mobility, and accompanying lower losses through the Joule effect. But graphene has zero bandgap, which results in a disqualifyingly low on/off ratio in transistor applications. TMD monolayers might be an alternative: they are structurally stable, display a band gap, and show electron mobilities comparable to those of silicon, so they can be used to fabricate transistors.

Although thin-layer TMDs have been found to have a lower electron mobility than bulk TMDs, most likely because their thinness makes them more susceptible to damage, it has been found that coating the TMDs with HfO_{2} or hexagonal boron nitride (hBN) increases their effective carrier mobility.

=== Optical properties ===
Theoretical energies of the A and B excitons
	A (eV)	A (nm)	B (eV)	B (nm)
MoS_{2}	1.78	695	1.96	632
MoSe_{2}	1.50	825	1.75	708
MoTe_{2}	1.06	1170	1.36	912
WS_{2}	1.84	673	2.28	544
WSe_{2}	1.52	815	2.00	620

A semiconductor can absorb photons with energy larger than or equal to its bandgap. This means that light with a shorter wavelength is absorbed. Semiconductors are typically efficient emitters if the minimum of the conduction band energy is at the same position in k-space as the maximum of the valence band, i.e., the band gap is direct. The band gap of bulk TMD material down to a thickness of two monolayers is still indirect, so the emission efficiency is lower compared to monolayered materials. The emission efficiency is about 10^{4} greater for TMD monolayer than for bulk material. The band gaps of TMD monolayers are in the visible range (between 400 nm and 700 nm). The direct emission shows two excitonic transitions called A and B, separated by the spin–orbit coupling energy. The lowest energy and therefore most important in intensity is the A emission. Owing to their direct band gap, TMD monolayers are promising materials for optoelectronics applications.

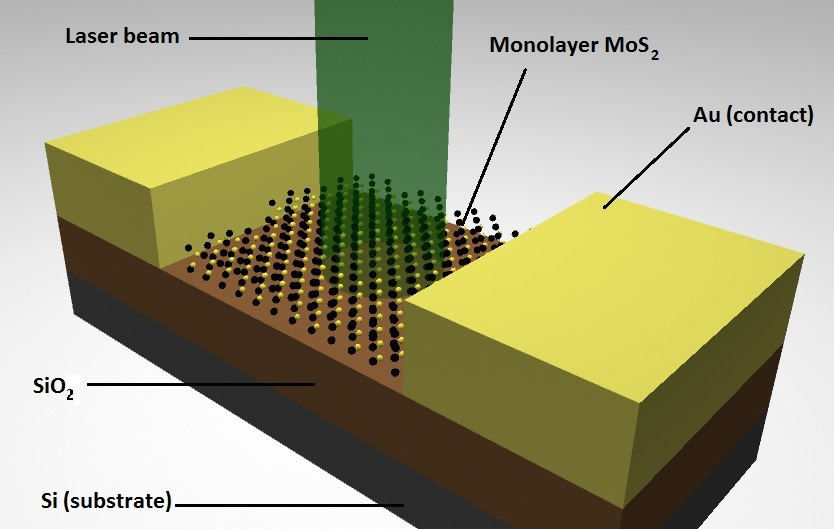
Representative scheme of the section of an ultrasensitive photodetector based on a monolayer of MoS_{2}

Atomic layers of MoS_{2} have been used as a phototransistor and ultrasensitive detectors. Phototransistors are important devices: the first with a MoS_{2} monolayer active region shows a photoresponsivity of 7.5 mA W^{−1} which is similar to graphene devices that reach 6.1 mA W^{−1}. Multilayer MoS_{2} show higher photoresponsivities, about 100 mA W^{−1}, which is similar to silicon devices. Making a gold contact at the far edges of a monolayer allows an ultrasensitive detector to be fabricated. Such a detector has a photoresponsivity reaching 880 A W^{−1}, 10^{6} greater than the first graphene photodetectors. This high degree of electrostatic control is due to the thin active region of the monolayer. Its simplicity and the fact that it has only one semiconductor region, whereas the current generation of photodetectors is typically a p–n junction, makes possible industrial applications such as high-sensitivity and flexible photodetectors. The only limitation for currently available devices is the slow photoresponse dynamics. Utilizing WSe_{2} the photoresponse was improved to a bandwidth of over 230 MHz by device symmetry optimization

=== Mechanical properties ===
Interest in the use of TMD monolayers such as MoS_{2,} WS_{2}, and WSe_{2} for the use in flexible electronics due to a change from an indirect band gap in 3D to a direct band gap in 2D emphasizes the importance of the mechanical properties of these materials. Unlike in bulk samples it is much more difficult to uniformly deform 2D monolayers of material and as a result, taking mechanical measurements of 2D systems is more challenging. A method that was developed to overcome this challenge, called atomic force microscopy (AFM) nanoindentation, involves bending a 2D monolayer suspended over a holey substrate with an AFM cantilever and measuring the applied force and displacement. Through this method, defect free mechanically exfoliated monolayer flakes of MoS_{2} were found to have a Young's modulus of 270 GPa with a maximum experienced strain of 10% before breaking. In the same study, it was found that bilayer mechanically exfoliated MoS_{2} flakes have a lower Young's modulus of 200 GPa, which is attributed to interlayer sliding and defects in the monolayer. With increasing flake thickness the bending rigidity of the flake plays a dominant role and it is found that the Young's modulus of multilayer, 5- 25 layers, mechanically exfoliated MoS_{2} flakes is 330 GPa.

The mechanical properties of other TMDs such as WS_{2} and WSe_{2} have also been determined. The Young's modulus of multilayer, 5-14 layers, mechanically exfoliated WSe_{2} is found to be 167 GPa with a maximum strain of 7%. For WS_{2}, the Young's modulus of chemical vapor deposited monolayer flakes is 272 GPa. From this same study the Young's modulus of CVD-grown monolayer flakes of MoS_{2} is found to be 264 GPa. This is an interesting result as the Young's modulus of the exfoliated MoS_{2} flake is nearly the same as that of the CVD grown MoS_{2} flake. It is generally accepted that chemically vapor deposited TMDs will include more defects when compared with the mechanically exfoliated films that are obtained from bulk single crystals, which implies that defects (points defects, etc.) that are included in the flake do not drastically affect the strength of the flake itself.

Under the application of strain, a decrease in the direct and indirect band gap is measured that is approximately linear with strain. Importantly, the indirect bandgap decreases faster with applied strain to the monolayer than the direct bandgap, resulting in a crossover from direct to indirect band gap at a strain level of around 1%. As a result, the emission efficiency of monolayers is expected to decrease for highly strained samples. This property allows mechanical tuning of the electronic structure and also the possibility of fabrication of devices on flexible substrates.

== Fabrication of TMD monolayers ==
=== Exfoliation ===
Exfoliation is a top down approach. In the bulk form, TMDs are crystals made of layers, which are coupled by Van-der-Waals forces. These interactions are weaker than the chemical bonds between the Mo and S in MoS_{2}, for example. So TMD monolayers can be produced by micromechanical cleavage, just as graphene.

The crystal of TMD is rubbed against the surface of another material (any solid surface). In practice, adhesive tape is placed on the TMD bulk material and subsequently removed. The adhesive tape, with tiny TMD flakes coming off the bulk material, is brought down onto a substrate. On removing the adhesive tape from the substrate, TMD monolayer and multilayer flakes are deposited. This technique produces small samples of monolayer material, typically about 5–10 micrometers in diameter.

Large quantities of exfoliated material can also be produced using liquid-phase exfoliation by blending TMD materials with solvents and polymers.

=== Chemical vapor deposition ===
Chemical vapor deposition (CVD) is another approach used to synthesize transition-metal dichalcogenides. It has been used broadly to synthesize many different TMDs because it can be easily adapted for different TMD materials. Generally, CVD growth of TMDs is achieved by putting precursors to the material, typically a transition-metal oxide and pure chalcogen, into a furnace with the substrate on which the material will form. The furnace is heated to high temperatures (anywhere from 650 to 1000 °C) with an inert gas, typically N_{2} or Ar, flowing through the tube. Some materials require H_{2} gas as a catalyst for formation, so it may be flowed through the furnace in smaller quantities than the inert gas.

Outside of traditional CVD, metal organic chemical vapor deposition (MOCVD) has been used to synthesize TMDs. Unlike traditional CVD described above, MOCVD uses gaseous precursors, as opposed to solid precursors and MOCVD is usually carried out at lower temperatures, anywhere from 300 to 900 °C. MOCVD has been shown to provide more consistent wafer-scale growth than traditional CVD.

CVD is often used over mechanical exfoliation despite its added complexity because it can produce monolayers ranging anywhere from 5 to 100 microns in size as opposed to the surface areas of roughly 5-10 microns produced using the mechanical exfoliation method. Not only do TMD monolayers produced by CVD have a larger surface area than those flakes produced by mechanical exfoliation, they are often more uniform. Monolayer TMD flakes with very little or no multilayer areas can be produced by chemical vapor deposition, in contrast to samples produced by mechanical exfoliation, which often have many multilayered areas. An alternative method has demonstrated that transition metal sulfides, including those of Ti, Zr, Hf, V, Nb, Ta, Cr, Mo, and W, can be synthesized through sulfurization of metal oxides in CS₂ vapor, achieving gram-scale production with simpler equipment and precursors. Geometrically confined-growth techniques are also recently applied to realize wafer-scale single-domain TMD monolayer arrays and their heterostructures.

=== Molecular-beam epitaxy ===
Molecular-beam epitaxy (MBE) is an established technique for growing semiconductor devices with atomic monolayer thickness control. MBE has been used to grow different TMDs, such as MoSe_{2}, WSe_{2}, and early transition metals, including titanium, vanadium, and chromium, tellurides, resulting in extremely clean samples with a thickness of only 0.5 monolayer.

The growth takes place in ultra-high vacuum (UHV). Precursors for the target materials are placed into evaporation cells, usually as powder (for example selenium), or as a rod (for example molybdenum). Some elements, such as selenium and tellurium, both of which are chalcogens, can be used in pure solid form as precursors. Some elements, however, can only be used when extracted from solid compounds, such as sulfur from FeS_{2}. The compound materials are broken down by heating up the material at UHV pressures. The evaporation cells are either Knudsen cells or electron beam evaporation based, depending on the materials; electron beam evaporation works with rods and can be used to reach high temperatures without overheating heating filaments, while Knudsen cells are suitable for powders and materials with a lower evaporation point. The evaporated materials are then directed towards the substrate; some common ones are MoS_{2}, HOPG, mica, or a sapphire substrate, such as Al_{2}O_{3}. A specific substrate is chosen to fit the targeted growth the best. The substrate is kept heated during the process to enhance the growth, with the temperatures ranging from 300 °C to 700 °C. The temperature of the substrate is one key factor of the growth, and altering it can be used to grow different phases, such as 1T and 2H, of the same material.

MBE holds some advantages in regards to both manual exfoliation and CVD. Use of reflection high-energy electron diffraction (RHEED) enables the in-situ monitoring of the growth, and this additionally with UHV and slow growth speed allows one to create clean, atomically thin monolayers. The improvement in sample quality is considerable when compared to exfoliation, as MBE is more effective in getting rid of the large flakes and impurities. In contrast to CVD, MBE proves beneficial when single-layerd TMDs are required. The disadvantage of MBE is that it is a relatively complicated process that requires large amounts of specialized equipment. Maintaining UHV can be difficult, and the preparation of samples is slower than in the other two methods.

=== Electrochemical Deposition ===
Electrodeposition is among the techniques that have emerged to produce TMDC semiconductors such as MoS_{2}, WS_{2} and WSe_{2}. Several reports have shown controlled electrodeposition of TMDC layers down to a monolayer. The materials have so far shown continuous films of good uniformity but typically require annealing temperatures > 500 °C. Electrodepositions of TMDC films have been successfully reported over conducting films such as graphene and TiN, and over a SiO_{2} insulator by growing the TMDC laterally starting from a conductive film.

=== Colloidal Synthesis ===
A strategy for colloidal synthesis from soluble transition metal and sulfur precursors was found recently, yielding highly defined nanoplatelets and nanosheets with a thickness of 1-2 monolayers.

== Electronic band structure ==
=== Band gap ===
In the bulk form, TMD have an indirect gap in the center of the Brillouin zone, whereas in monolayer form the gap becomes direct and is located in the K points.

=== Spin–orbit coupling ===
Theoretical energies of the spin–orbit coupling
	Valence band splitting (eV)	Conduction band splitting (eV)
MoS_{2}	0.148	0.003
WS_{2}	0.430	0.026
MoSe_{2}	0.184	0.007
WSe_{2}	0.466	0.038
MoTe_{2}	0.219	0.034

For TMDs, the atoms are heavy and the outer layers electronic states are from d-orbitals that have a strong spin–orbit coupling. This spin orbit coupling removes the spins degeneracy in both the conduction and valence band i.e. introduces a strong energy splitting between spin up and down states. In the case of MoS_{2}, the spin splitting in conduction band is in the meV range, it is expected to be more pronounced in other material like WS_{2}. The spin orbit splitting in the valence band is several hundred meV.

=== Spin-valley coupling and the electron valley degree of freedom ===
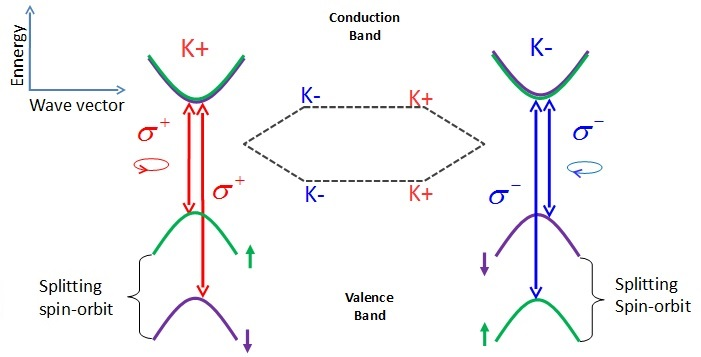
Spin splittings and optical selection rules

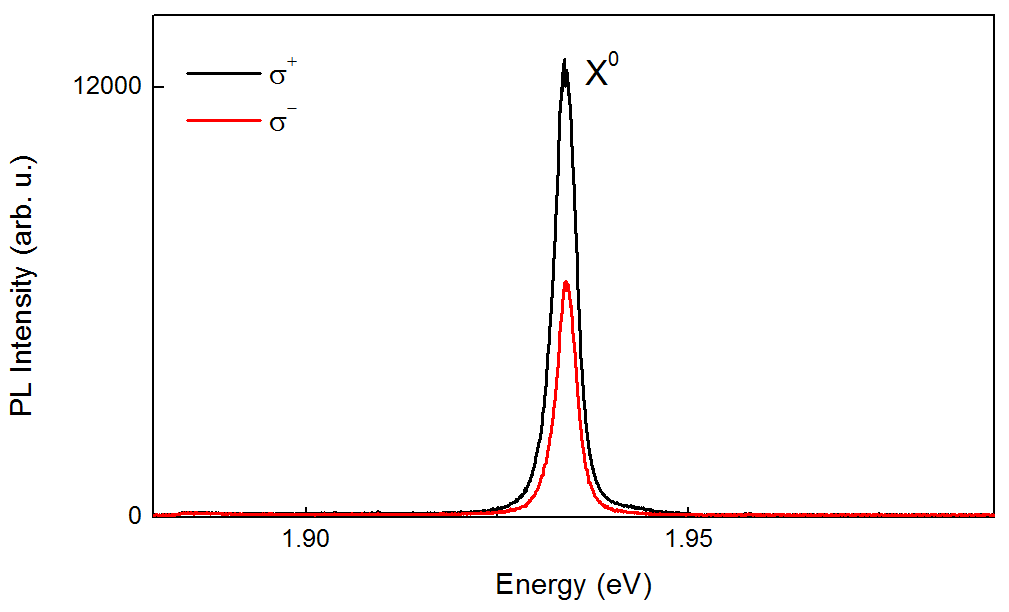
Photoluminescence (PL) of a MoS_{2} monolayer at 4 K excited by a σ+ polarized laser. The monolayer absorbs the incident light and re-emits it at lower energy.

By controlling the charge or spin degree of freedom of carriers, as proposed by spintronics, novel devices have already been made. If there are different conduction/valence band extrema in the electronic band structure in k-space, the carrier can be confined in one of these valleys. This degree of freedom opens up a new field of physics: the controlling of carriers k-valley index, also called valleytronics.

For TMD monolayers crystals, the parity symmetry is broken, there is no more inversion center. K valleys of different directions in the 2D hexagonal Brillouin zone are no longer equivalent. So there are two kinds of K valley called K+ and K−. Also there is a strong energy degeneracy of different spin states in valence band. The transformation of one valley to another is described by the time reversal operator. Moreover, crystal symmetry leads to valley dependent optical selection rules: a right circular polarized photon (σ+) initializes a carrier in the K+ valley and a left circular polarized photon (σ-) initializes a carrier in the K− valley. Thanks to these two properties (spin-valley coupling and optical selection rules), a laser of specific polarization and energy allows to initialize the electron valley states (K+ or K−) and spin states (up or down).

=== Emission and absorption of light: excitons ===
A single layer of TMD can absorb up to 20% of incident light, which is unprecedented for such a thin material. When a photon of suitable energy is absorbed by a TMD monolayer, an electron is created in the conduction band; the electron now missing in the valence band is assimilated by a positively charged quasi-particle called a hole. The negatively charged electron and the positively charged hole are attracted via the Coulomb interaction, forming a bound state called an exciton which can be thought as a hydrogen atom (with some difference). This Bosonic-like quasi-particle is very well known and studied in traditional semiconductors, such as GaAs and ZnO but in TMD it provides exciting new opportunities for applications and for studying fundamental physics. Indeed, the reduced dielectric screening and the quantum size effect present in these ultrathin materials make the binding energy of excitons much stronger than those in traditional semiconductors. Binding energies of several hundreds of meV are observed for all the four principal members of the TMD family.

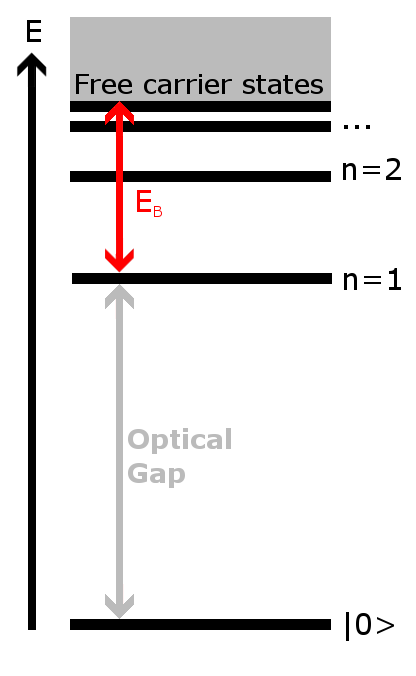
Energy-level diagram of an exciton as if it were a hydrogen atom

As mentioned before, we can think about an exciton as if it were a hydrogen atom, with an electron bound to a hole. The main difference is that this system is not stable and tends to relax to the vacuum state, which is here represented by an electron in the valence band. The energy difference between the exciton 'ground state' (n=1) and the 'vacuum state' is called optical gap and is the energy of the photon emitted when an exciton recombines. This is the energy of the photons emitted by TMD monolayers and observed as huge emission peaks in photoluminescence (PL) experiments, such as the one labelled X^{0} in the figure. In this picture the binding energy E_{B} is defined as the difference between the free particle band gap and the optical band gap and represent, as usual, the energy needed to take the hole and the electron apart. The existence of this energy difference is called band gap renormalization. The analogy with hydrogen atom doesn't stop here as excitonic excited states were observed at higher energies and with different techniques.

Because of the spin–orbit splitting of the valence band two different series of excitons exist in TMD, called A- and B-excitons. In the A series the hole is located in the upper branch of the Valence band while for the B-exciton the hole is in the lower branch. As a consequence the optical gap for B-exciton is larger and the corresponding peak is found at higher energy in PL and reflectivity measurements.

Another peak usually appears in the PL spectra of TMD monolayers, which is associated to different quasi-particles called trions. These are excitons bound to another free carrier which can be either an electron or a hole. As a consequence a trion is a negative or positively charged complex. The presence of a strong trion peak in a PL spectrum, eventually stronger than the peak associated with exciton recombination, is a signature of a doped monolayer. It is believed now that this doping is extrinsic, which means that it arises from charged trap states present in the substrate (generally SiO_{2}). Positioning a TMD monolayer between two flakes of hBN removes this extrinsic doping and greatly increase the optical quality of the sample.

At higher excitation powers biexcitons have also been observed in monolayer TMDs. These complexes are formed by two bound excitons. Theory predicts that even larger charge-carrier complexes, such as charged biexcitons (quintons) and ion-bound biexcitons, are stable and should be visible in the PL spectra. Additionally, quantum light has been observed to originate from point defects in these materials in a variety of configurations.

== Radiation effects of TMD monolayers ==
Common forms of radiation used to create defects in TMDs are particle and electromagnetic irradiation, impacting the structure and electronic performance of these materials. Scientist have been studying the radiation response of these materials to be used in high-radiation environments, such as space or nuclear reactors. Damage to this unique class of materials occurs mainly through sputtering and displacement for metals or radiolysis and charging for insulators and semiconductors. To sputter away an atom, the electron must be able to transfer enough energy to overcome the threshold for knock-on damage. Yet, the exact quantifiable determination of this energy still needs to be determined for TMDs. Consider MoS_{2} as an example, TEM exposure via sputtering creates vacancies in the lattice, these vacancies are then observed to be collected together in spectroscopic lines. Additionally, when looking at the radiation response of these materials, the three parameters that are proven to matter most are the choice of substrate, the sample thickness, and the sample preparation process.

== Janus TMD monolayers ==
A new type of asymmetric transitional metal dichalcogenide, the Janus TMDs monolayers, has been synthesized by breaking the out-of-plane structural symmetry via plasma assisted chemical vapor deposition. Janus TMDs monolayers show an asymmetric structure MXY (M = Mo or W, X/Y = S, Se or Te) exhibiting out-of-plane optical dipole and piezoelectricity due to the imbalance of the electronic wave-function between the dichalcogenides, which are absent in a non-polar TMDs monolayer, MX_{2}. In addition, the asymmetric structure of Janus MoSSe provides an enhanced Rashba spin–orbit interaction, which suggests asymmetrically Janus TMDs monolayer can be a promising candidate for spintronic applications. In addition, Janus TMDs monolayer has been considered as an excellent material for electrocatalysis or photocatalysis.

Janus MoSSe can be synthesized by inductively coupled plasma CVD (ICP-CVD). The top layer of sulfur atoms on MoS_{2} is stripped using hydrogen ions, forming an intermediate state, MoSH. Afterward, the intermediate state is selenized by thermal annealing at 250 °C in an environment of hydrogen and argon gases.

== Aspirational uses ==
=== Electronics ===
A field-effect transistor (FET) made of monolayer MoS_{2} showed an on/off ratio exceeding 10^{8} at room temperature owing to electrostatic control over the conduction in the 2D channel. FETs made from MoS_{2}, MoSe_{2}, WS_{2}, and WSe_{2} have been made. Their electron mobility, band gap and their very thin structure makes them promising for use in thin, flexible electronics.

=== Sensing ===
The band gap TMDs possess makes them attractive for sensors as a replacement for graphene. FET-based biosensors rely on receptors attached to the monolayer TMD. When target molecules attach to the receptors, it affects the current flowing through the transistor.

However, it has been shown that one can detect nitrogenous bases in DNA when they pass through nanopores made in MoS_{2}. Nanopore sensors are based upon measuring ionic current through a nanopore in a material. When a single strand of DNA passes through the pore, there is a marked decrease in ionic current for each base. By measuring the current flowing through the nanopore, the DNA can then be sequenced.

To this date, most sensors have been created from MoS_{2}, although WS_{2} has been explored as well.

== Specific examples ==
=== Molybdenum disulfide ===
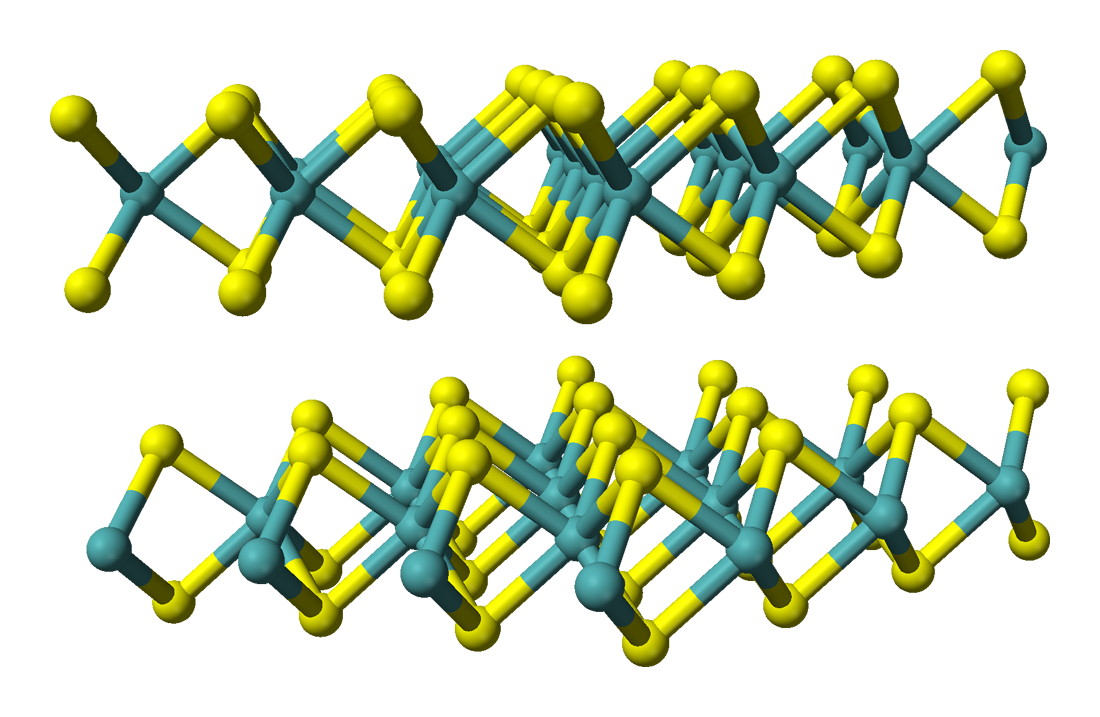
Layered structure of MoS_{2}, with Mo in blue and S in yellow

Balls and sticks model of a single layer 1H and 1T molybdenum disulfide

Molybdenum disulfide monolayers consist of a unit of one layer of molybdenum atoms covalently bonded to two layers of sulfur atoms. While bulk molybdenum sulfide exists as 1T, 2H, or 3R polymorphs, molybdenum disulfide monolayers are found only in the 1T or 2H form. The 2H form adopts a trigonal prismatic geometry while the 1T form adopts an octahedral or trigonal antiprismatic geometry. Molybdenum monolayers can also be stacked due to Van der Waals interactions between each layer.

==== Electrical ====
The electrical properties of molybdenum sulfide in electrical devices depends on factors such as the number of layers, the synthesis method, the nature of the substrate on which the monolayers are placed on, and mechanical strain.

As the number of layers decrease, the band gap begins to increase from 1.2eV in the bulk material up to a value of 1.9eV for a monolayer. Odd number of molybdenum sulfide layers also produce different electrical properties than even numbers of molybdenum sulfide layers due to cyclic stretching and releasing present in the odd number of layers. Molybdenum sulfide is a p-type material, but it shows ambipolar behavior when molybdenum sulfide monolayers that were 15 nm thick were used in transistors. However, most electrical devices containing molybdenum sulfide monolayers tend to show n-type behavior.

The band gap of molybdenum disulfide monolayers can also be adjusted by applying mechanical strain or an electrical field. Increasing mechanical strain shifts the phonon modes of the molybdenum sulfide layers. This results in a decrease of the band gap and metal-to-insulator transition. Applying an electric field of 2-3Vnm^{−1} also decreases the indirect bandgap of molybdenum sulfide bilayers to zero.

Solution phase lithium intercalation and exfoliation of bulk molybdenum sulfide produces molybdenum sulfide layers with metallic and semiconducting character due to the distribution of 1T and 2H geometries within the material. This is due to the two forms of molybdenum sulfide monolayers having different electrical properties. The 1T polymorph of molybdenum sulfide is metallic in character while the 2H form is more semiconducting. However, molybdenum disulfide layers produced by electrochemical lithium intercalation are predominantly 1T and thus metallic in character as there is no conversion to the 2H form from the 1T form.

==== Thermal ====
The thermal conductivity of molybdenum disulfide monolayers at room temperature is 34.5W/mK while the thermal conductivity of few-layer molybdenum disulfide is 52W/mK. The thermal conductivity of graphene, on the other hand, is 5300W/mK. Due to the rather low thermal conductivity of molybdenum disulfide nanomaterials, it is not as promising material for high thermal applications as some other 2D materials.

==== Exfoliation ====
Exfoliation techniques for the isolating of molybdenum disulfide monolayers include mechanical exfoliation, solvent assisted exfoliation, and chemical exfoliation.

Solvent assisted exfoliation is done by sonicating bulk molybdenum disulfide in an organic solvent such as isopropanol and N-methyl-2-pyrrolidone, which disperses the bulk material into nanosheets as the Van der Waals interactions between the layers in the bulk material are broken. The amount of nanosheets produced is controlled by the sonication time, the solvent-molybdenum disulfide interactions, and the centrifuge speed. Compared to other exfoliation techniques, solvent assisted exfoliation is the simplest method for large scale production of molybdenum disulfide nanosheets.

The micromechanical exfoliation of molybdenum disulfide was inspired by the same technique used in the isolation of graphene nanosheets. Micromechanical exfoliation allows for low defect molybdenum disulfide nanosheets but is not suitable for large scale production due to low yield.

Chemical exfoliation involves functionalizing molybdenum difsulfide and then sonicating to disperse the nanosheets. The most notable chemical exfoliation technique is lithium intercalation in which lithium is intercalated into bulk molybdenum disulfide and then dispersed into nanosheets by the addition of water.

==== Chemical vapor deposition ====
Chemical vapor deposition of molybdenum disulfide nanosheets involves reacting molybdenum and sulfur precursors on a substrate at high temperatures. This technique is often used in the preparing electrical devices with molybdenum disulfide components because the nanosheets are applied directly on the substrate; unfavorable interactions between the substrate and the nanosheets that would have occurred had they been separately synthesized are decreased. In addition, since the thickness and area of the molybdenum disulfide nanosheets can be controlled by the selection of specific precursors, the electrical properties of the nanosheets can be tuned.

Electroplating

Among the techniques that have been used to deposit molybdenum disulfide is electroplating. Ultra-thin films consisting of few-layers have been produced via this technique over graphene electrodes. In addition, other electrode materials were also electroplated with MoS_{2}, such as Titanium Nitride (TiN), glassy carbon and polytetrafluoroethylene. The advantage that this technique offers in producing 2D materials is its spatial growth selectivity and its ability to deposit over 3D surfaces. Controlling the thickness of electrodeposited materials can be achieved by adjusting the deposition time or current.

==== Laser ablation ====
Pulsed laser deposition involves the thinning of bulk molybdenum disulfide by laser to produce single or multi-layer molybdenum disulfide nanosheets. This allows for synthesis of molybdenum disulfide nanosheets with a defined shape and size. The quality of the nanosheets are determined by the energy of the laser and the irradation angle.

Lasers can also be used to form molybdenum disulfide nanosheets from molybdenum disulfide fullerene-like molecules.

=== Hafnium disulfide ===
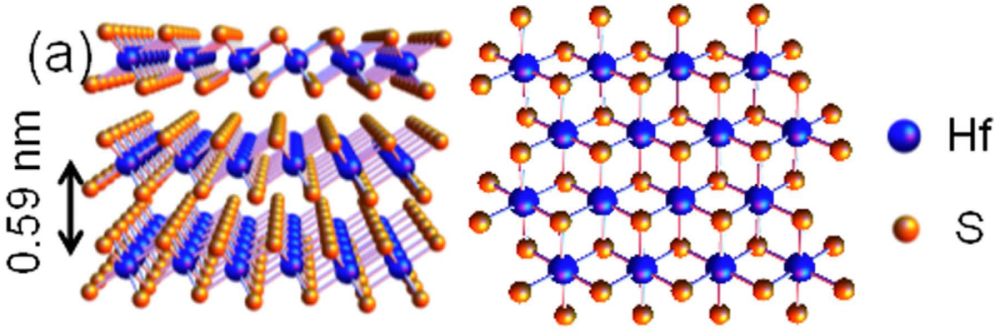
HfS_{2} structure

Hafnium disulfide (HfS_{2}) has a layered structure with strong covalent bonding between the Hf and S atoms in a layer and weak van der Waals forces between layers. The compound has CdI_{2} type structure and is an indirect band gap semiconducting material. The interlayer spacing between the layers is 0.56 nm, which is small compared to group VIB TMDs like MoS_{2}, making it difficult to cleave its atomic layers. However, recently its crystals with large interlayer spacing has grown using a chemical vapor transport route. These crystals exfoliate in solvents like N-Cyclohexyl-2-pyrrolidone (CHP) in a time of just some minutes resulting in a high-yield production of its few-layers resulting in increase of its indirect bandgap from 0.9 eV to 1.3 eV. As an application in electronics, its field-effect transistors has been realised using its few layers as a conducting channel material offering a high current modulation ratio larger than 10000 at room temperature. Therefore, group IVB TMDs also holds potential applications in the field of opto-electronics.

=== Tungsten diselenide ===
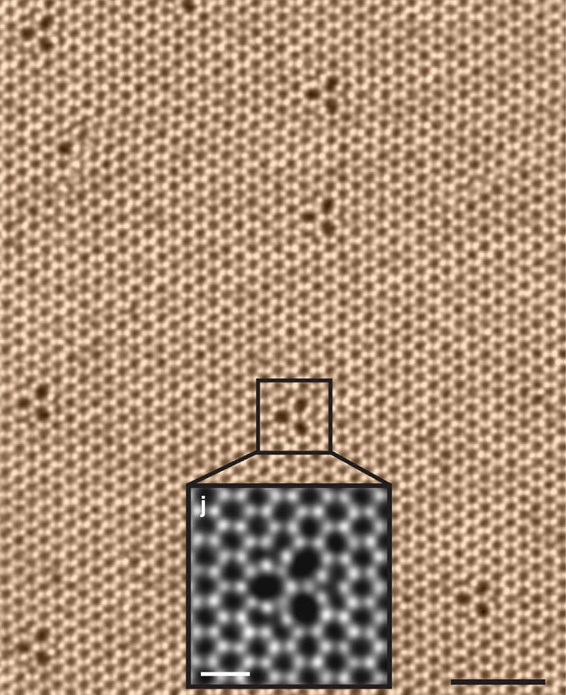
Atomic image of a WSe_{2} monolayer showing hexagonal symmetry and three-fold defects. Scale bar: 2 nm (0.5 nm in the inset).

Tungsten diselenide is an inorganic compound with the formula WSe_{2}. The compound adopts a hexagonal crystalline structure similar to molybdenum disulfide. Every tungsten atom is covalently bonded to six selenium ligands in a trigonal prismatic coordination sphere, while each selenium is bonded to three tungsten atoms in a pyramidal geometry. The tungsten – selenium bond has a bond distance of 2.526 Å and the distance between selenium atoms is 3.34 Å. Layers stack together via van der Waals interactions. WSe_{2} is a stable semiconductor in the group-VI transition-metal dichalcogenides. The electronic bandgap of WSe_{2} can be tuned by mechanical strain which can also allow for conversion of the band type from indirect-to-direct in a WSe_{2} bilayer.
