= Indium selenide =

Indium selenide, an inorganic compound composed of indium and selenium, refers to:

- Indium(II) selenide
- Indium(III) selenide
