= Tungsten diselenide =

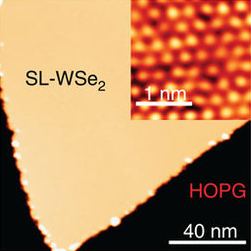
- WSe_{2} monolayer on graphene (yellow) and its atomic image (inset)

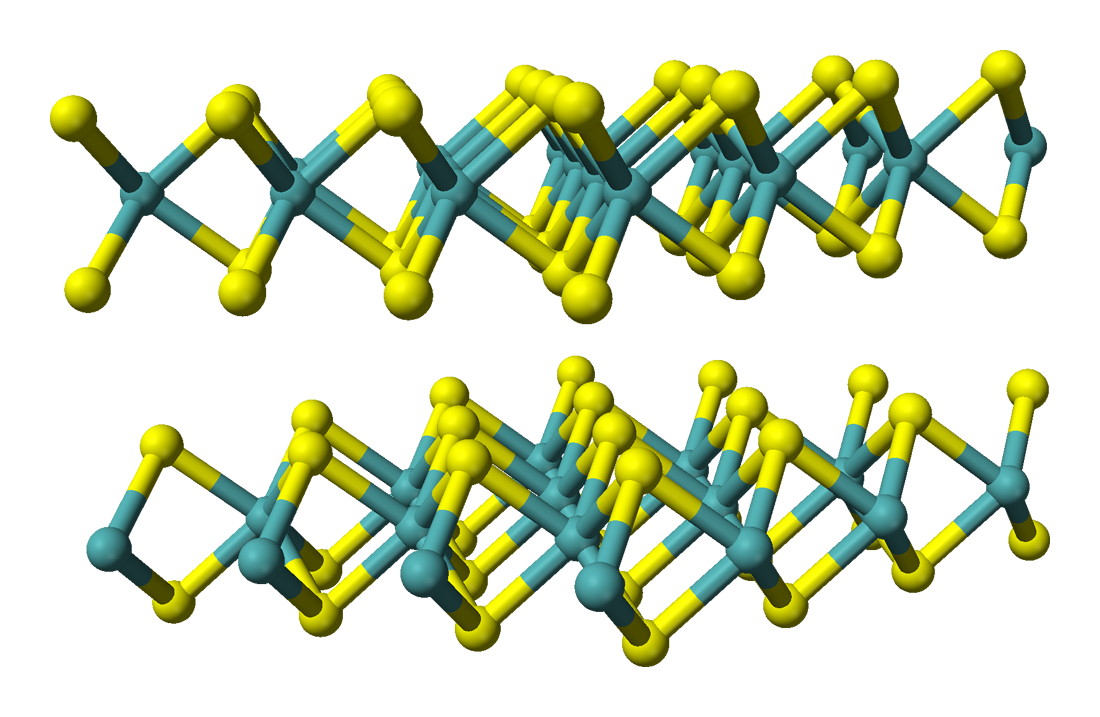

Identifiers
| CAS Number | 12067-46-8 |
| 3D model (JSmol) | Interactive image |
| ChemSpider | 60601189 |
| ECHA InfoCard | 100.031.877 |
| EC Number | 235-078-7 |
| PubChem CID | 82910 |
| CompTox Dashboard (EPA) | DTXSID8065240 |
- InChI: InChI=1S/2Se.W Key: ROUIDRHELGULJS-UHFFFAOYSA-N
- SMILES: [Se]=[W]=[Se]

Properties
| Chemical formula | WSe_{2} |
| Molar mass | 341.76 g/mol |
| Appearance | grey to black solid |
| Odor | odorless |
| Density | 9.32 g/cm^{3} |
| Melting point | > 1200 °C |
| Solubility in water | insoluble |
| Band gap | ~1 eV (indirect, bulk); ~1.7 eV (direct, monolayer) |

Structure
| Crystal structure | hP6, space group P6_{3}/mmc, No 194 |
| Lattice constant | a = 0.3297 nm, c = 1.2982 nm |
| Coordination geometry | Trigonal prismatic (W^{IV}); Pyramidal (Se^{2−}) |

Thermochemistry
| Std enthalpy of formation (Δ_{f}H^{⦵}_{298}) | −185.3 kJ mol^{−1} |

Hazards
- Occupational safety and health (OHS/OSH)
| Main hazards | External MSDS |
- GHS labelling
| Pictograms | (GHS06: Toxic) (GHS08: Health hazard) (GHS09: Environmental hazard) |
| Signal word | Warning |
| Hazard statements | H301, H331, H373, H410 |
| Precautionary statements | P260, P264, P270, P271, P273, P301+P316, P304+P340, P316, P319, P321, P330, P391, P403+P233, P405, P501 |

Related compounds
| Other anions | Tantalum diselenide |
- Except where otherwise noted, data are given for materials in their standard state (at 25 °C [77 °F], 100 kPa). Infobox references

Tungsten diselenide is an inorganic compound with the formula WSe_{2}. The compound adopts a hexagonal crystalline structure similar to molybdenum disulfide. The tungsten atoms are covalently bonded to six selenium ligands in a trigonal prismatic coordination sphere while each selenium is bonded to three tungsten atoms in a pyramidal geometry. The tungsten–selenium bond has a length of 0.2526 nm, and the distance between selenium atoms is 0.334 nm. It is a well studied example of a layered material. The layers stack together via van der Waals interactions. WSe_{2} is a very stable semiconductor in the group-VI transition metal dichalcogenides.

== Structure and properties ==
The hexagonal (P6_{3}/mmc) polymorph 2H-WSe_{2} is isotypic with hexagonal MoS_{2}. The two-dimensional lattice structure has W and Se arranged periodically in layers with hexagonal symmetry. Similar to graphite, van der Waals interactions hold the layers together; however, the 2D-layers in WSe_{2} are not atomically thin. The large size of the W cation renders the lattice structure of WSe_{2} more sensitive to changes than MoS_{2}.

In addition to the typical semiconducting hexagonal structure, a second metallic polymorph of WSe_{2} exists. This phase, 1T-WSe_{2}, is based on a tetragonal symmetry with one WSe_{2} layer per repeating unit. The 1T-WSe_{2} phase is less stable and transitions to the 2H-WSe_{2} phase. WSe_{2} can form a fullerene-like structure.

The Young's modulus varies greatly as a function of the number of layers in a flake. For a single monolayer, the reported Young's modulus is 258.6 ± 38.3 GPa.

== Synthesis ==
Heating thin films of tungsten under pressure from gaseous selenium and high temperatures (>800 K) using the sputter deposition technique leads to the films crystallizing in hexagonal structures with the correct stoichiometric ratio.

W + 2 Se → WSe_{2}

== Potential applications ==
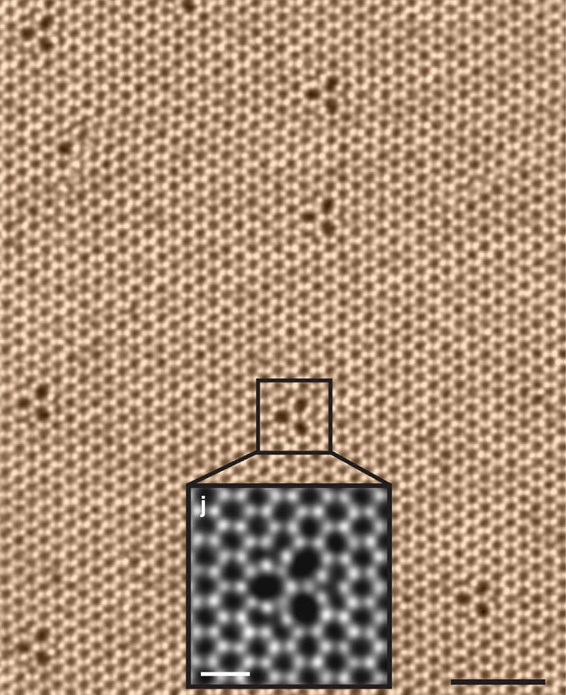
Atomic image of a WSe_{2} monolayer showing hexagonal symmetry and three-fold defects. Scale bar: 2 nm (0.5 nm in the inset).

The potential applications of transition metal dichalcogenides in solar cells and photonics are often discussed. Bulk WSe_{2} has an optical band gap of ~1.35 eV with a temperature dependence of −4.6×10^{−4} eV/K. WSe_{2} photoelectrodes are stable in both acidic and basic conditions, making them potentially useful in electrochemical solar cells.

The properties of WSe_{2} monolayers differ from those of the bulk state, as is typical for semiconductors. Mechanically exfoliated monolayers of WSe_{2} are transparent photovoltaic materials with LED properties. The resulting solar cells pass 95 percent of the incident light, with one tenth of the remaining five percent converted into electrical power. The material can be changed from p-type to n-type by changing the voltage of an adjacent metal electrode from positive to negative, allowing devices made from it to have tunable bandgaps.

Superconductivity has been reported in twisted bilayer WSe_{2}, with a transition temperature of 200 mK.

== See also ==
- Transition metal dichalcogenide monolayers
