= Hadjipanayis =

Hadjipanayis, Hatzipanagis (Greek: Χατζηπαναγής) is a Greek surname. Notable people with the surname include:

- George C. Hadjipanayis, Greek physicist
- Vasilis Hatzipanagis (born 1954), Greek footballer
