= Andreas H. Hielscher =

Biomedical engineer

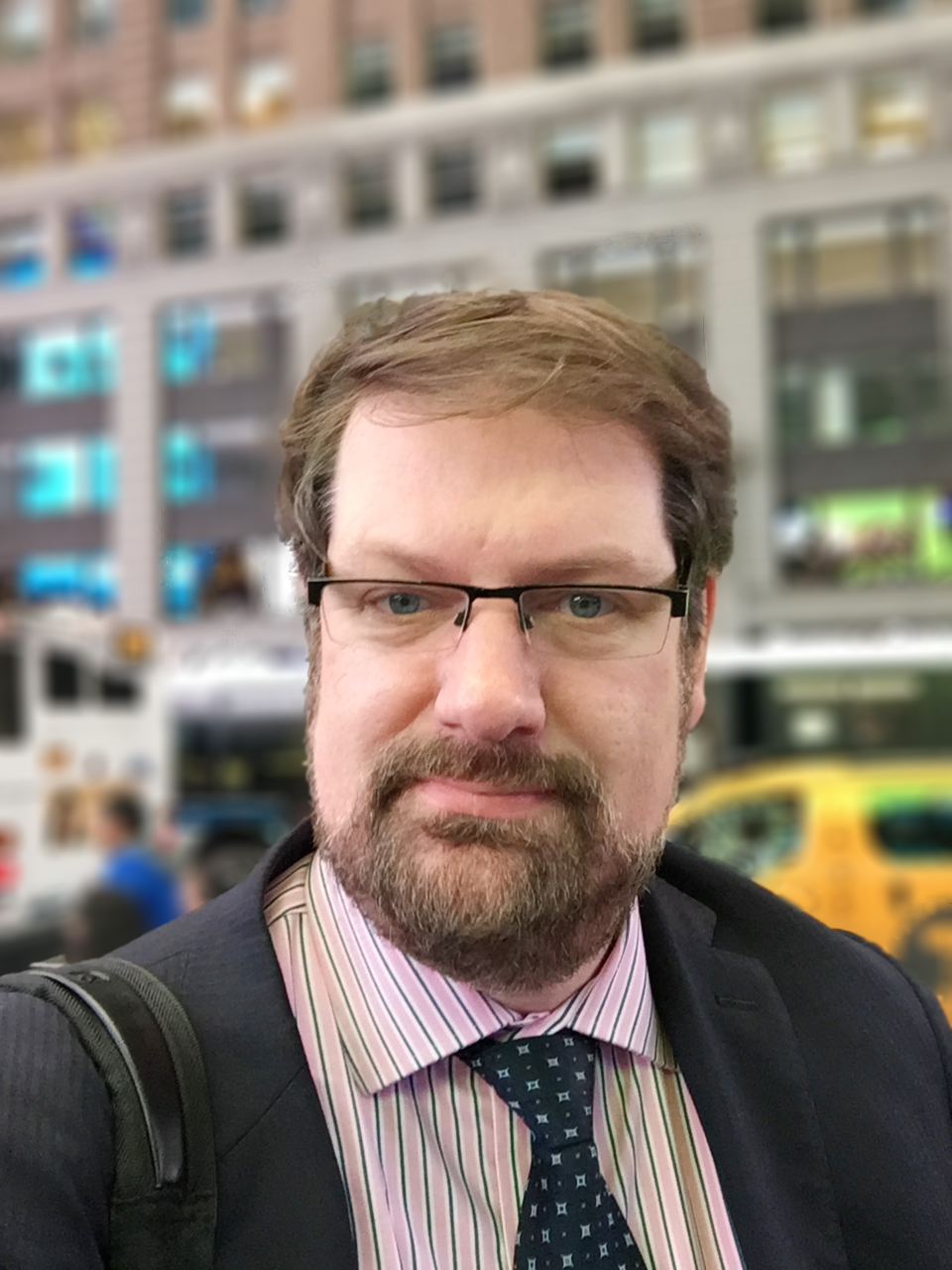
- Hielscher in 2018
- Education: Leibniz University Hannover; Rice University
- Known for: Optical tomography, biomedical optics
- Awards: Fellow, American Institute for Medical and Biological Engineering (2013)
- Scientific career
- Fields: Biomedical Optics; Diffuse Optical Tomography
- Workplaces: Los Alamos National Laboratory; SUNY Downstate Medical Center; Columbia University; New York University Tandon School of Engineering
- Doctoral advisor: Frank Tittel; Steven L. Jacques

Andreas H. Hielscher is a biomedical engineer whose research has focused on biomedical optics, optical tomography, and diffuse optical tomography for medical imaging. He is a professor at the New York University Tandon School of Engineering, where he was appointed founding chair of the Department of Biomedical Engineering in 2020. He directs the Clinical Biophotonics Laboratory, which develops optical imaging methods for clinical applications including cancer, vascular disease, arthritis, and brain imaging. In 2013, he was elected a Fellow of the American Institute for Medical and Biological Engineering for contributions to the design, development, mathematical modeling, and clinical application of optical imaging systems.

== Education and early career ==
Hielscher studied physics at Leibniz University Hannover, receiving a Diplom in 1991 for research performed under Herbert Welling at the Laser Center Hannover. He then pursued doctoral studies in electrical and computer engineering at Rice University, completing his Ph.D. in 1995 under Frank Tittel, Antonios Mikos, and Nobel Laureate Robert Curl. The research for his dissertation (Noninvasive determination of blood oxygenation in the brain by near-infrared reflectance spectroscopy) was performed in collaboration with Steven L. Jacques at the MD Anderson Cancer Center.

After completing his doctorate, Hielscher held a Laboratory President's Postdoctoral Fellowship at Los Alamos National Laboratory, where he continued research on light propagation in biological tissue and optical imaging.

== Academic career ==
In 1998, Hielscher joined the faculty of SUNY Downstate Medical Center as an assistant professor in the Department of Pathology. In 2001, he joined Columbia University, where he founded and directed the Biophotonics and Optical Radiology Laboratory. At Columbia, he held appointments in biomedical engineering, electrical engineering, and radiology, and served as 2nd chair of the Department of Biomedical Engineering from 2011 to 2012, succeeding Van C. Mow.

In 2020, Hielscher was recruited by Dean Jelena Kovačević as the founding chair of the Department of Biomedical Engineering at the New York University Tandon School of Engineering. An article in IEEE Spectrum described the department's emphasis on clinical collaboration and translational biomedical engineering after his move to NYU.

== Research ==
Hielscher's research has centered on diffuse optical imaging and optical tomography, a biomedical imaging approach that uses near-infrared light to probe tissue structure and physiology. Early in his career, he and collaborators studied radiative-transfer-based models of photon migration in biological tissue and compared transport-theory calculations with diffusion-based approximations. He later co-authored work on optical tomography reconstruction based on the radiative transfer equation.

His laboratory subsequently developed optical tomography systems for dynamic and three-dimensional imaging. These included work on optical tomographic imaging of brain hemodynamics in small animals and dynamic optical tomography for breast cancer imaging.

== Clinical applications ==
Hielscher and collaborators have applied optical imaging methods to several clinical areas. In breast cancer, his group developed optical imaging approaches intended to monitor hemodynamic response during neoadjuvant chemotherapy. A study co-authored by Hielscher reported the use of dynamic optical tomography to evaluate breast cancer response during neoadjuvant chemotherapy.

In vascular imaging, Hielscher's group developed optical tomography approaches for assessing peripheral arterial disease and diabetic vascular complications. Related work used dynamic diffuse optical tomography to image peripheral arterial disease.

His research has also included optical methods for inflammatory joint disease. In collaboration with groups at the Technische Universität Berlin and the University of Göttingen medical school, optical tomographic methods for diagnosing rheumatoid arthritis were developed. Later work by Hielscher, rheumatologist Anca Askanase, and collaborators examined optical imaging for lupus arthritis.

== Technology translation ==
Hielscher has been involved in efforts to translate optical imaging technologies toward clinical and commercial use. In 2020, VOTIS Subdermal Imaging Technologies announced that it had licensed vascular optical tomographic imaging technology from Columbia University. Another startup, CaroRhythm, emerged from research in NYU Tandon’s Clinical Biophotonics Laboratory and focused on a non-invasive wearable system for carotid-artery monitoring in stroke survivors.

== Honors and professional activities ==
Hielscher was elected a Fellow of the American Institute for Medical and Biological Engineering in 2013 for contributions to the design, development, mathematical modeling, and clinical application of optical imaging systems. His other honors and professional activities include the Whitaker Foundation Young Investigator Award, service as general chair of the European Conference on Biomedical Optics, and leadership roles in biomedical engineering and biomedical optics meetings.

He has served as an associate editor of IEEE Transactions on Medical Imaging and has participated in review panels and advisory activities for national and international research organizations.

== See also ==
- Biomedical optics
- Diffuse optical imaging
- Optical tomography
