= Titanium diselenide =

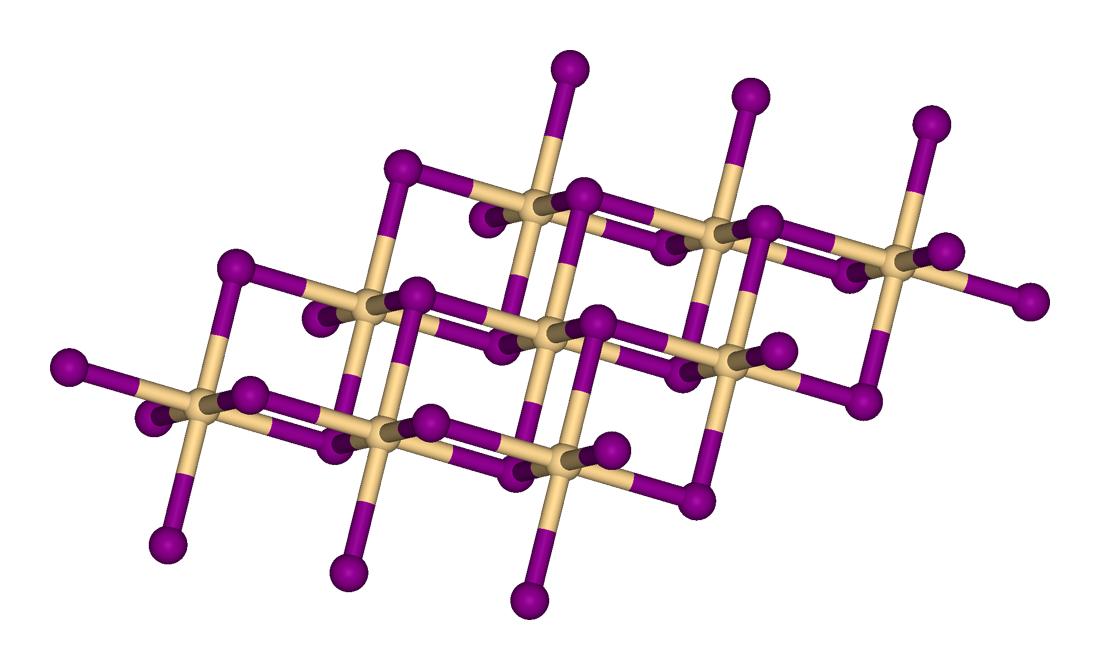
- Cadmium iodide

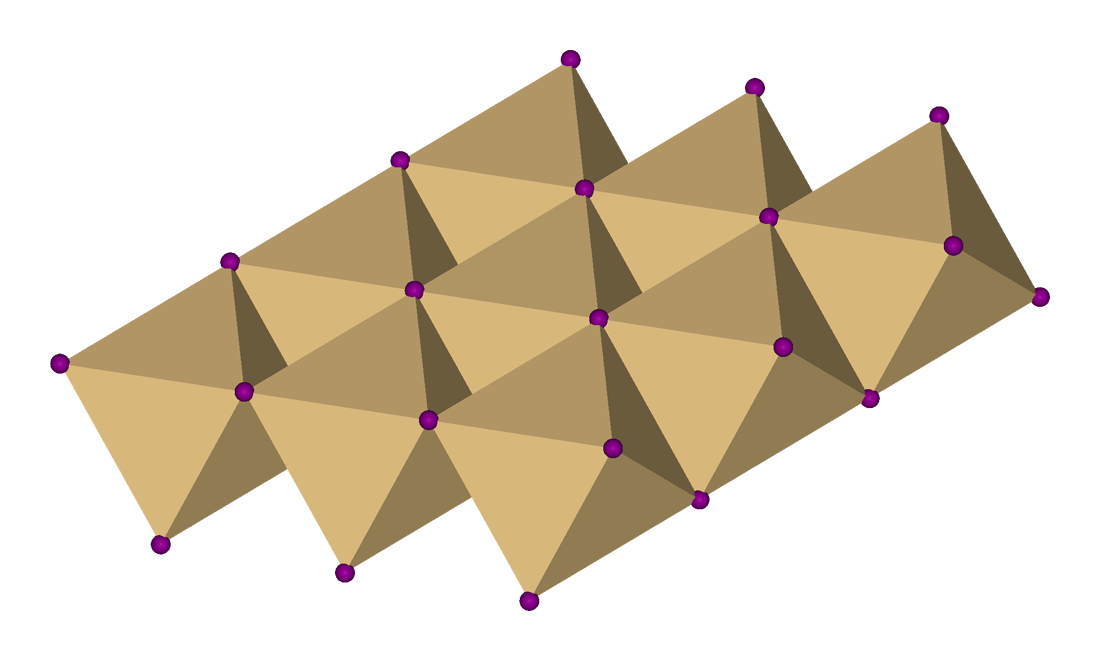
- Cadmium iodide

Names
- IUPAC name bis(selanylidene)titanium
- Other names titanium selenide, titanium diselenide

Identifiers
CAS Number	12067-45-7
3D model (JSmol)	Interactive image
ChemSpider	65322015
ECHA InfoCard	100.031.876
EC Number	235-077-1
PubChem CID	82909
CompTox Dashboard (EPA)	DTXSID9065239
- InChI: InChI=1S/2Se.Ti Key: SWFBFRDZBFXEHJ-UHFFFAOYSA-N
- SMILES: [Se]=[Ti]=[Se]

Properties
Chemical formula	TiSe_{2}
Molar mass	205.787

Hazards
- GHS labelling
Pictograms	(GHS06: Toxic) (GHS08: Health hazard) (GHS09: Environmental hazard)
Signal word	Danger
Hazard statements	H301, H331, H373, H410
Precautionary statements	P260, P264, P270, P271, P273, P301+P316, P304+P340, P316, P319, P321, P330, P391, P403+P233, P405, P501
- Except where otherwise noted, data are given for materials in their standard state (at 25 °C [77 °F], 100 kPa). Infobox references

Titanium diselenide (TiSe_{2}) also known as titanium(IV) selenide, is an inorganic compound of titanium and selenium. In this material selenium is viewed as selenide (Se^{2−}) which requires that titanium exists as Ti^{4+}. Titanium diselenide is a member of metal dichalcogenides, compounds that consist of a metal and an element of the chalcogen column within the periodic table. Many exhibit properties of potential value in battery technology, such as intercalation and electrical conductivity, although most applications focus on the less toxic and lighter disulfides, e.g. TiS_{2}.

== Structure ==
Within the titanium-selenium system, many stoichiometries have been identified. Titanium diselenide crystallizes with the CdI_{2} -type structure, in which the octahedral holes between alternating hexagonal closely packed layer of Se^{2−} layers (that is half of the total number of octahedral holes) are occupied by Ti^{4+} centers. The CdI_{2} structure is often referred to as a layer structure as the repeating layers of atoms perpendicular to the close packed layer form the sequence Se-Ti-Se^{…}Se-Ti-Se^{…}Se-Ti-Se with weak van der Waals interactions between the selenium atoms in adjacent layers. The structure has (6,3)-coordination, being octahedral for the cation and trigonal pyramidal for the anions. The structure type is found commonly for many transition metal halides as well. This layered structure is known to undergo intercalation by alkali metals (M), resulting in the formation of M_{x}TiSe_{2} (x ≤ 1), thereby expanding the weak van der Waals gaps between the 2D layered sheets.

== Synthesis ==
A mixture of titanium and selenium are heated under argon atmosphere to produce crude samples. The crude product is typically purified by chemical vapor transport using iodine as the transport agent.

Ti + 2 Se → TiSe_{2}
