= Intercalation (chemistry) =

Reversible insertion of an ion into a material with layered structure

Intercalation is the reversible inclusion or insertion of a molecule (or ion) into layered materials with layered structures. Examples are found in graphite and transition metal dichalcogenides.

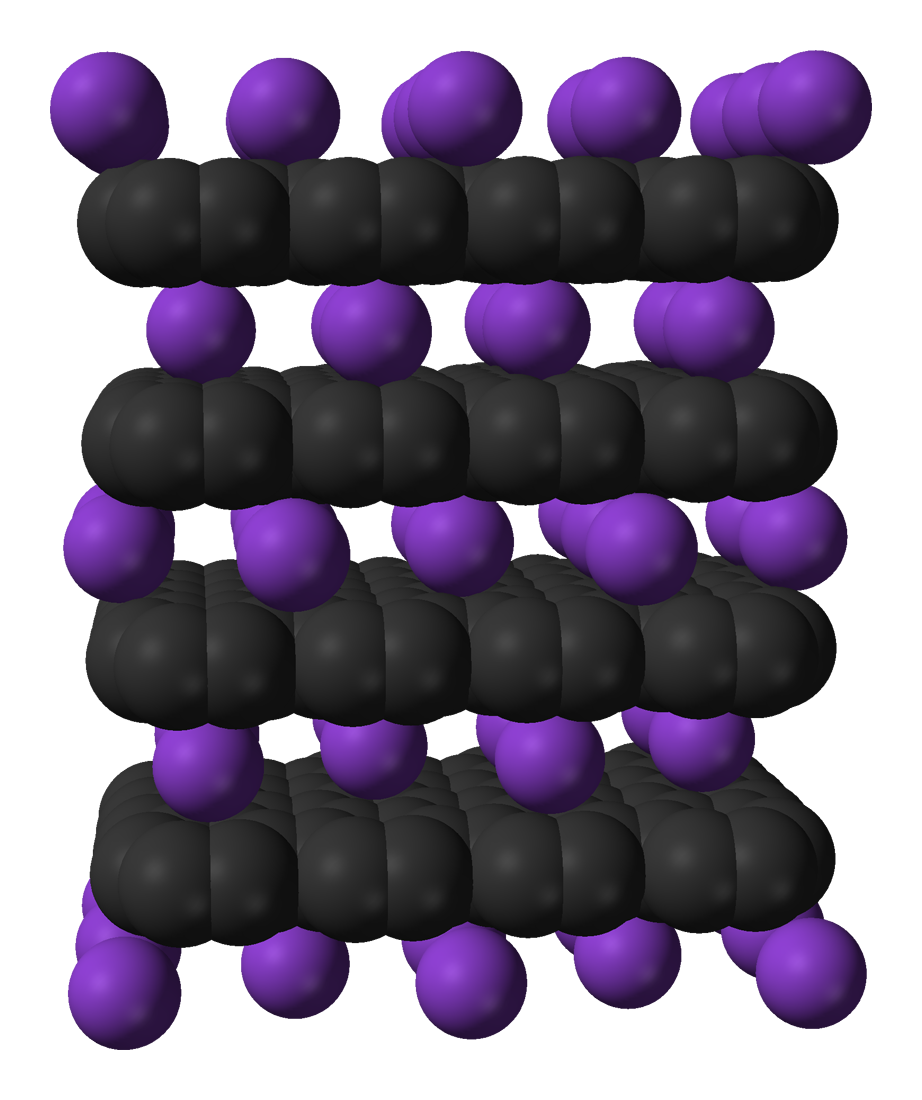
Model of intercalation of potassium into graphite

== Examples ==
=== Graphite ===
One famous intercalation host is graphite, which intercalates potassium as a guest. Intercalation expands the van der Waals gap between sheets, which requires energy. Usually this energy is supplied by charge transfer between the guest and the host solid, i.e., redox. Two potassium graphite compounds are KC_{8} and KC_{24}. Carbon fluorides (e.g., (CF)_{x} and (C_{4}F)) are prepared by reaction of fluorine with graphitic carbon. The color is greyish, white, or yellow. The bond between the carbon and fluorine atoms is covalent, thus fluorine is not intercalated. Such materials have been considered as a cathode in various lithium batteries.

Diagram of intercalation of Li into a titanium disulfide cathode. One axis of the TiS_{2} crystal swells, and charge transfers from Li to Ti.

Treating graphite with strong acids in the presence of oxidizing agents causes the graphite to oxidize. Graphite bisulfate, [C_{24}]^{+}[HSO_{4}]^{−}, is prepared by this approach using sulfuric acid and a little nitric acid or chromic acid. The analogous graphite perchlorate can be made similarly by reaction with perchloric acid.

=== Lithium-ion batteries ===
One of the largest and most diverse uses of the intercalation process by the early 2020s is in lithium-ion electrochemical energy storage, in the batteries used in many handheld electronic devices, mobility devices, electric vehicles, and utility-scale battery electric storage stations.

By 2023, all commercial lithium-ion cells use intercalation compounds as active materials, and most use them in both the cathode and anode within the battery physical structure.

In 2012, three researchers, Goodenough, Yazami and Yoshino, received the 2012 IEEE Medal for Environmental and Safety Technologies for developing the intercalated lithium-ion battery. Subsequently, Goodenough, Whittingham, and Yoshino were awarded the 2019 Nobel Prize in Chemistry "for the development of lithium-ion batteries".

== Exfoliation ==
An extreme case of intercalation is the complete separation of the layers of the material. This process is called exfoliation. Typically aggressive conditions are required involving highly polar solvents and aggressive reagents. This process can be used to form nanosheets in many layered oxide structures like LiCoO2 and NMC, which are used in lithium-ion battery cathode applications.

== Related materials ==
In biochemistry, intercalation is the insertion of molecules between the bases of DNA. This process is used as a method for analyzing DNA and it is also the basis of certain kinds of poisoning.

Clathrates are chemical substances consisting of a lattice that traps or contains molecules. Usually, clathrate compounds are polymeric and completely envelop the guest molecule. Inclusion compounds are often molecules, whereas clathrates are typically polymeric. Intercalation compounds are not 3-dimensional, unlike clathrate compounds. According to IUPAC, clathrates are "Inclusion compounds in which the guest molecule is in a cage formed by the host molecule or by a lattice of host molecules."

== Stress caused by intercalation ==
Intercalation of atoms into layered materials induces volumetric changes and lattice mismatch within the crystal structure. These changes generate localized tensile and compressive stresses. The magnitude of these stresses depends on factors such as the size of the intercalating species and the crystallographic structure of the host material. In electrochemical systems, such as lithium-ion batteries, operating conditions—particularly the charge/discharge rate and temperature—also influence stress levels.

=== Effects during battery operation ===
During electrochemical cycling (the repeated charging and discharging of a battery), ions are intercalated and deintercalated from electrode materials, causing expansion and contraction of the layered structure. These volumetric fluctuations generate local stresses that can vary between cycles, leading to the buildup of residual stress. Over time, this accumulation can result in mechanical fatigue and the formation of microcracks, especially at stress concentration sites.

Such mechanical degradation contributes to capacity loss through several mechanisms:

- Loss of electrical connectivity within the active material,
- Increased formation of the solid-electrolyte interphase (SEI), consuming electrolyte and active lithium,
- Enhanced susceptibility to further cracking and dendritic lithium growth.

Collectively, these failure modes contribute to the progressive deterioration of battery performance and ultimately, failure.

=== Implications on battery design ===
To mitigate intercalation-induced stress, electrode materials are selected based on their structural compatibility with the intercalating ion—most commonly lithium. Commercial lithium-ion electrodes, such as LiCoO_{2}, LiFePO_{4}, or lithium graphite intercalation compound, are chosen in part for their relatively low intercalation-induced stress and structural stability, which contribute to longer cycle life.

With the increasing interest in solid-state batteries, new challenges emerge. Solid electrolytes, unlike their liquid counterparts, can also accumulate mechanical stress as ions migrate through them. The volumetric changes in both the electrode and the solid electrolyte can lead to poor interfacial contact, impeding ion transport and potentially causing delamination at phase boundaries.

=== Research ===
Relevant to energy storage systems, the mechanical effects of ion intercalation, particularly volume expansion and the resulting stress accumulation, are central to the degradation mechanisms observed in many electrode materials. Some electrode architectures can better accommodate these mechanical stresses. Nanostructured materials, including hollow particles, porous frameworks, and core–shell morphologies, can distribute mechanical loads more uniformly during cycling. Flexible polymeric binders and conductive networks that are capable of self-healing or plastic deformation offer further potential to mitigate stress-induced damage.

In solid-state batteries, the issue is even more pronounced due to the rigidity of inorganic solid electrolytes. Unlike liquid electrolytes, which can conform to morphological changes, solid electrolytes are more susceptible to cracking, void formation, and delamination at interfaces during cycling. These mechanical failures can impede ion transport and lead to cell failure. Strategies to reduce stress in solid-state systems include the use of compliant interlayers, interface engineering, and electrolyte materials with improved mechanical toughness.

== See also ==
- Clathrate compound: where a molecule is included into a lattice
- Stacking (chemistry)
- Hydrogen embrittlement
