= Exfoliation (chemistry) =

Process that separates layered materials into nanomaterials

In chemistry, exfoliation is a process that separates layered materials into nanomaterials by breaking the bonds between layers using mechanical, chemical, or thermal procedures.

While exfoliation has historical roots dating back centuries, significant advances and widespread research gained momentum after Novoselov and Geim's discovery of graphene using Scotch tape in 2004. Their Nobel Prize-winning research primarily relied on mechanical exfoliation for the production of graphene which sparked an immediate interest in the exfoliation process. Today, exfoliation is regarded as the most widely used nanomaterial production technique.

Exfoliation typically involves breaking weak bonds called van der Waals bonds to create two-dimensional materials, such as graphene or transition metal dichalcogenide monolayers. While various reversible chemical processes, such as intercalation can disrupt the weak bonds in a lamellar structure and introduce guest species, many of them fail to produce single-sheet materials as the processes are not strong enough to cancel the interlayer attractions. However, during exfoliation, the high energy input leads to an extreme bond-breaking process that irreversibly separates the layers into single sheets. Lately, it has been shown that if the energy input is substantial enough, the procedure can even break much stronger, bonds such as metallic or ionic bonds to create non-van der Waals materials like hematene or other nanoplatelets.

Exfoliation has practical applications in fields such as electronics, biomedicine, and aerospace engineering. It can be used to create materials with properties tailored for specific uses such as efficient energy storage or lightweight and durable materials.

== History ==
While the use of exfoliation can be traced back to ancient Chinese and Mayan pottery, the earliest scientific work involving exfoliation was the production of vermiculite by Thomas H. Webb, in 1824. However, during this early period, no substantial research was conducted to understand the nature of the mechanisms that facilitated these reactions. Arguably, the first research that delved into the mechanism of the process rather than its usage was Brodie's work, which revealed that certain acids produced lamellar carbon structures in 1855. Despite this discovery, extensive research on the topic did not immediately follow. The exfoliation concepts we have today were not developed until the realization that graphite absorbed alkali metals in 1926. This discovery laid the groundwork for a more solid theoretical framework, enabling scientists to apply the method in their production processes. One method that made use of this theoretical background and eventually led to further development of the process as a production technique was Rüdorff and Hoffman's work, which introduced an electrochemical method for exfoliation in 1938. The development of electrochemical exfoliation piqued the interest of more researchers and more people started regarding the process as a production technique. One of the most notable examples of the success of the method as a mass production technique was the invention of the first commercial lithium carbon fluoride batteries in 1973.

The real turning point for exfoliation research came in 2004 when Novoselov and Geim isolated graphene through mechanical exfoliation using Scotch tape. This innovative research earned them the Nobel Prize in Physics in 2010, reigniting the interest in exfoliation methods. In subsequent years, numerous processes were developed for more precise manufacturing and higher yields. While most of the exfoliation research focused on graphite and graphene during the last few decades, recently, the rather difficult processing of graphene and its lack of an obvious band structure led many research groups to begin working on different elements to utilize exfoliation for the production of other nanomaterials. One of the most significant breakthroughs of this new wave of research has been the discovery of non-van der Waals nanoplatelets. This discovery demonstrated that exfoliation could occur without relying on weak bonds, which opened up new and promising applications in the industry.

== Types ==
The exfoliation process is typically applied to lamellar structures with weak bonds. While these bonds are weak enough to be easily broken by an external force, they are strong enough to not separate into single layers. In order to separate the material into single layers, the attraction between consecutive layers must be overcome. As the interest in exfoliated material research surged many researchers started to develop new and better ways to overcome these interlayer attractions. Despite the high number of methods it is possible to classify them into three distinct categories based on the source of energy used in the process: mechanical, chemical, and thermal exfoliation.

=== Mechanical exfoliation ===
In mechanical exfoliation, external forces act upon the material, breaking the bonds due to the stress accumulated within the material. Depending on the intensity and the specific nature of the phenomenon, these forces break the van der Waals forces, separating materials into 2D nanostructures. Sometimes, a solvent is introduced to the material to facilitate complete breakdown, as liquid environments significantly reduce bond strength compared to vacuum conditions.

While mechanical exfoliation is effective in separating the layers, it lacks predictability and systematic results. The process requires repetition until individual layers are achieved. To obtain consistent nanomaterials with specific properties, experimentation and fine-tuning of conditions based on the results is required. Therefore, mechanical exfoliation techniques are rather empirical, and most mathematical models rely on empirical results rather than the ab-initio calculations.

The original method proposed by Novoselov and Geim, micromechanical cleavage, was essentially a mechanical exfoliation method. Consequently, mechanical exfoliation methods were developed more rapidly than the others. Major mechanical exfoliation methods include micromechanical cleavage and liquid phase separation.

==== Micromechanical cleavage ====
Micromechanical cleavage is the original graphene production method proposed by Novoselov and Geim. This process involves using sticky tape to get graphite samples and separating the layers until getting a single layer. Although the process yielded high-purity single-layered materials, it fell out of favor quickly as it required several repetitions for a single layer of graphene and was likely to damage the graphene layers during the process.

==== Liquid phase separation ====
Liquid phase separation is one of the most widely used exfoliation methods. Its high yields, high purity, and scalability make it one of the most preferred exfoliation methods. It works by providing a liquid medium for the mechanical exfoliation methods. The liquid medium significantly reduces the strength of the bonds in the material compared to vacuum conditions, making it easier for mechanical forces to break the weak bonds in the material. However, due to the interfacial tension forces, liquid phase separation does not always yield uniform results. When the tension forces do not balance out, graphene single layers may break due to the tension forces. To achieve relatively uniform results, the overall energy of the system must be minimized. The best way to optimize this condition is to use solvents with similar surface tensions to the material of interest. Liquid phase separation utilizes various external forces to break the van der Waals forces. The most widely used liquid phase separation methods include sonication, which uses sound waves, and shearing, which uses shear forces.

===== Sonication =====
The sonication method utilizes ultrasonic sound waves to create micrometer-sized bubbles in liquid environments. When these bubbles reach a critical size, they collapse with an instantaneous temperature of 5000 K, a local pressure of 20MPa, and a heating/cooling rate up to 109 K s−1.These sudden physical differences create shock waves that can act on lamellar materials and break the weak forces in between the layers. Although sonication is a long-known laboratory technique, its implementation into graphene exfoliation was in 2008 and it led to liquid exfoliation becoming the predominant technique.

While sonication is generally used as an exfoliation method on its own, it is also used as a further processing method to perfect the nanoflakes created with other exfoliation methods. Therefore it is a common technique used in combination with the other methods. One disadvantage of sonication is the reaction time though. A complete exfoliation reaction may take days to finish. However, prolonged exfoliation times allow the creation of more stable solutions, making long sonication times favorable for obtaining purer, defect-free products. Nanomaterials created with sonication yield 1.5 times larger unperturbed particle size.

===== Shearing =====
The shearing method makes use of lab mixers to exfoliate lamellar structures into single-layered nanomaterials. Lab mixers create a sufficient shear force that allows consecutive layers of the material to slip over each other. Which produces massive quantities of highly pure material. Although the shearing method was widely used as a further processing method to break up relatively larger clusters of nanomaterials into single layers, before, in 2010, it was introduced as a direct method to exfoliate graphite into graphene. Later studies confirmed the applicability of the method to other lamellar materials such as h-BN, MoS2, WS2, MoSe2, and MoTe2.

While this method has a high yield and purity among the other exfoliation methods, its known linear relations with concentration, mixing time, rotor speed, rotor diameter, and inverse relation with liquid volume, gives one of the best controllability out of all the exfoliation methods. This innovative procedure has been adapted for household kitchen mixers, significantly reducing the costs and complexity of the exfoliation methods, thereby sparking another wave of research in layered structures.

=== Chemical exfoliation ===
Chemical exfoliation employs the intercalation process to separate material layers. During intercalation, guest ions or free electrons are introduced to the layers, disrupting the bond structure and forming new bonds. For example, in the case of van der Waals forces, which are common in chemical exfoliation, positive and negative regions are induced, attracting ions. Given that the bonds between layers are weak, they tend to break, forming new, stronger bonds with these ions. Typically, these stronger bonds lead to the creation of functional groups that significantly reduce interlayer attractions. At this stage, the interlayer attraction becomes low, and thanks to the ability of the functional groups to decompose with further processing, the layers can be easily separated.

Chemical exfoliation's scalability advantages over other production methods have made it one of the most widely used techniques. In addition to its scalability, the variety of chemicals available plays an important role in encouraging researchers to explore various production methods. Chemical exfoliation is also commonly used in combination with mechanical and thermal exfoliation methods to obtain purer results. The most widely used chemical exfoliation methods are chemical vapor deposition, graphite oxide reduction, and electrochemical exfoliation.

==== Chemical vapor deposition ====
First introduced in 2008, chemical vapor deposition emerged as one of the most popular methods for graphene exfoliation. This method utilizes a transition metal film as a base layer and exposes it to hydrocarbons at high temperatures(900-1000 °C) and ambient pressure. During the process, hydrocarbon decomposes, and carbon atoms form one to ten layers of graphene flakes over the metal film. The metal film is then cooled down at a determined rate to achieve specific particle sizes. This process is especially useful for applications such as circuit drawing and surface-based applications of graphene, including the production of photovoltaic cells. Although the method was widely used until the last decade, its relatively expensive process has been replaced by other methods. However, there is still ongoing research to further develop the process for more efficient use with various materials.

==== Oxide reduction ====
The oxide reduction method is particularly widely used with graphite to create graphene. It involves introducing oxide functional groups into the lamellar structure, which doubles the distance between graphite layers and reduces van der Waals attractions. These functional groups are then removed using reductants, resulting in single graphene layers from the graphite, which can now be easily exfoliated due to reduced van der Waals attractions. This method is especially valuable for fine-tuning the band gap properties of graphene, which naturally lacks a band gap.

While this method was widely used over the last decade, its impurity levels led to its decline in popularity. The presence of a large number of holes and defects made the produced graphene unsuitable for electronics, and the chemicals used were hazardous. In 2014, a research group succeeded in isolating graphene layers without the use of oxidants, significantly increasing the purity of the samples and eliminating the need for further processing of the products. This advancement is expected to reignite interest in oxide reduction exfoliation.

==== Electrochemical exfoliation ====
One of the most promising exfoliation methods is electrochemical exfoliation, which has been popular among researchers since its introduction in 2008. This method is mainly based on 20th-century studies on electrolysis and electrochemical intercalation. Electrochemical exfoliation makes use of potential differences between a lamellar structured electrode and a platinum electrode to attract oppositely charged ions to the electrodes. These accumulations trigger the intercalation process in the material and ultimately result in the complete exfoliation of the material into single nanomaterial layers. However, intercalation is not always the only reaction mechanism, as sometimes bubbles are observed depending on the solvent and electrolyte used. These bubbles also facilitate exfoliation by creating a similar effect to the sonication method.

The process might be called cathodic or anodic exfoliation, depending on which electrode is the lamellar structured electrode. Cathodic exfoliation requires an organic solvent medium with a lithium or alkylammonium electrolyte, while anodic exfoliation can be done with water and strong electrolytes. Anodic exfoliation is more efficient than cathodic exfoliation, as it forms oxide and hydroxide functional groups, significantly increasing intercalation in the material. However, anodic exfoliation also results in impure products, so the choice between the two methods depends on the specific application. Electrochemical exfoliation products may also require further processing.

Unlike liquid exfoliation, electrochemical exfoliation eliminates most of the chemical reactions involved, resulting in purer products. This method increases scalability, controllability, and decreases contamination and reaction time for the exfoliated material. Therefore, many researchers aim to implement the method into the industry for the mass production of carbon nanomaterials and transition metal dichalcogenide monolayers.

=== Thermal exfoliation ===
Thermal exfoliation uses heat as a source of energy for the exfoliation process. Despite heat being such a fundamental energy for most of the other chemical processes its use in exfoliation is relatively recent. Most thermal exfoliation methods have the same approach; chemically intercalated lamellar structures are subjected to extreme temperatures to decompose the functional groups created through chemical methods. The decomposition of these functional groups generates gases that build up pressure between layers, countering the van der Waals attractions between material layers. When well-chosen functional group/temperature combinations are used, complete separation of the layers occurs.

One advantage of thermal exfoliation methods over others is their higher production rate, a crucial property for mass production applications. Additionally, their reaction times are the shortest among all exfoliation methods. A process that might take days to complete with mechanical exfoliation can be finished within seconds using thermal exfoliation methods. However, reduced reaction time and higher yields come at the cost of reduced control over particle size due to the nature of the process. Therefore, the process still lacks the optimization and reproducibility required by the industry. Today, the most widely used thermal methods are high-temperature, low-temperature, and microwave exfoliation methods.

==== High temperature thermal exfoliation ====
High-temperature thermal exfoliation employs temperatures above 550 °C to decompose functional groups. The biggest advantage of this method is its short reaction times. An exfoliation process that might take days to complete with mechanical exfoliation can be done in a matter of seconds through high-temperature thermal exfoliation. However, decreased reaction times come at the price of impure products. Due to the extremely high temperatures, operation costs increase significantly. Moreover, the carbon dioxide and water vapors produced during the decomposition of oxide groups react with the material, causing defects and impurities in the material.

==== Low temperature thermal exfoliation ====
Low-temperature thermal exfoliation aims to retain the benefits of high-temperature thermal exfoliation while avoiding unexpected outcomes such as high costs and impurities. For this purpose, low-temperature thermal exfoliation employs relatively lower temperatures of 200 °C-550 °C to decompose the functional groups. These temperatures yield purer results than high-temperature thermal exfoliation because the chemicals produced at this temperature do not readily react with the layered material itself. Although this decrease in temperature affects reaction times, it is usually favored to achieve purer results. Even though the reaction time is shorter in low-temperature thermal exfoliation compared to high-temperature, it is still significantly shorter than in other methods. Additionally, low-temperature thermal exfoliation allows for fine-tuning of the bandgap properties of materials, making it an ideal method for electronic applications.

Microwave irradiation exfoliation

Microwave irradiation exfoliation is another exfoliation method that would decrease the complexity of the exfoliation experiments greatly. First utilized for the production of exfoliated graphite, it was later adapted for other nanomaterials. In the microwave irradiation exfoliation method, materials partially intercalated through chemical processes are exposed to microwave radiation. Ions and molecules trapped between layers absorb microwaves, leading to local temperature changes. These local changes trigger significant physical and chemical phenomena that result in complete exfoliation of the lamellar material. Due to reduced costs and high efficiency, microwave irradiation exfoliation is one of the most popular exfoliation methods. The method also provides higher yields with pure results within shorter timeframes. Although microwave irradiation exfoliation has great benefits there is still some ambiguity in the mechanisms of this method as the products of the method are reported to be able to get exfoliated again through chemical exfoliation.

== Applications ==
Ever since the isolation of graphene, exfoliation has been the most common and reliable method for creating graphene, with the ongoing development of new techniques to optimize the process. As graphene finds increasing applications in various areas of electronics, the quest for an optimized industrial production method for graphene becomes more significant. Currently, graphene is projected to play a crucial role in the production of low-cost solar cells, energy storage systems, and sensors. Therefore, various forms of graphene, from liquid suspensions to dispersions, coatings to dust, are necessary for implementation in industrial production methods. In addition to the graphene, the exfoliation process enables the production of various other carbon allotropes, with the most important ones being carbon nanotubes and carbon quantum dots. These materials are also expected to create billion-dollar industries, and as a result, commercialization of these materials are anticipated to show advancements in exfoliation methods.

Although graphene is expected to be one of the most important materials in the future, there are still some disputes about some of its applications. The challenging processing of graphene and its lack of an obvious band structure have led many researchers to explore new uses of the exfoliation methods. This shift has recently increased research into efficient production methods for transition metal dichalcogenide (TMD) monolayers significantly. TMD monolayers have band gaps ranging from insulators to semiconductors, thanks to their quantum confinement effects. Therefore, they are expected to have significant applications in the near future, particularly with the further development of optoelectronics. Currently, TMD monolayers find applications in electronic devices such as solar cells, photodetectors, light-emitting diodes, and phototransistors. There is also a growing interest in their use in power storage systems, such as batteries and supercapacitors. Since exfoliation is TMD monolayers' most common production technique, it is projected that TMD monolayers' potential commercialization will require extensive use of exfoliation methods, eventually creating new applications for exfoliation.

Theoretically, exfoliation requires the presence of weak bonds. However, recent studies have shown that even materials with metallic and ionic bonds can be exfoliated with the proper procedures. The materials created through these methods are called non-van der Waals nanoplatelets. One notable non-van der Waals material is the Hematane which is a single sheet of hematite, the most abundant form of iron ore. Hematane is known to have interesting photocatalytic properties due to its modified bandgap properties, offering potential applications in energy storage, optoelectronics, and biomedicine. Since one of the most common ways to create hematite is through liquid phase separation, applications of hematite would increase the interest in exfoliation.
