= Nute =

Nute is a surname. Notable people with the surname include:

- Alonzo Nute (1826–1892), American politician
- Benjamin Nute (1800–1877), American farmer and businessman
- Grace Lee Nute (1895–1990), American historian
- Richard Nute, American engineer

== Other uses ==
- Nute Gunray, the leader of the Trade Federation in the Star Wars prequel trilogy
