= Frank Tittel =

German-born laser scientist (1933–2026)

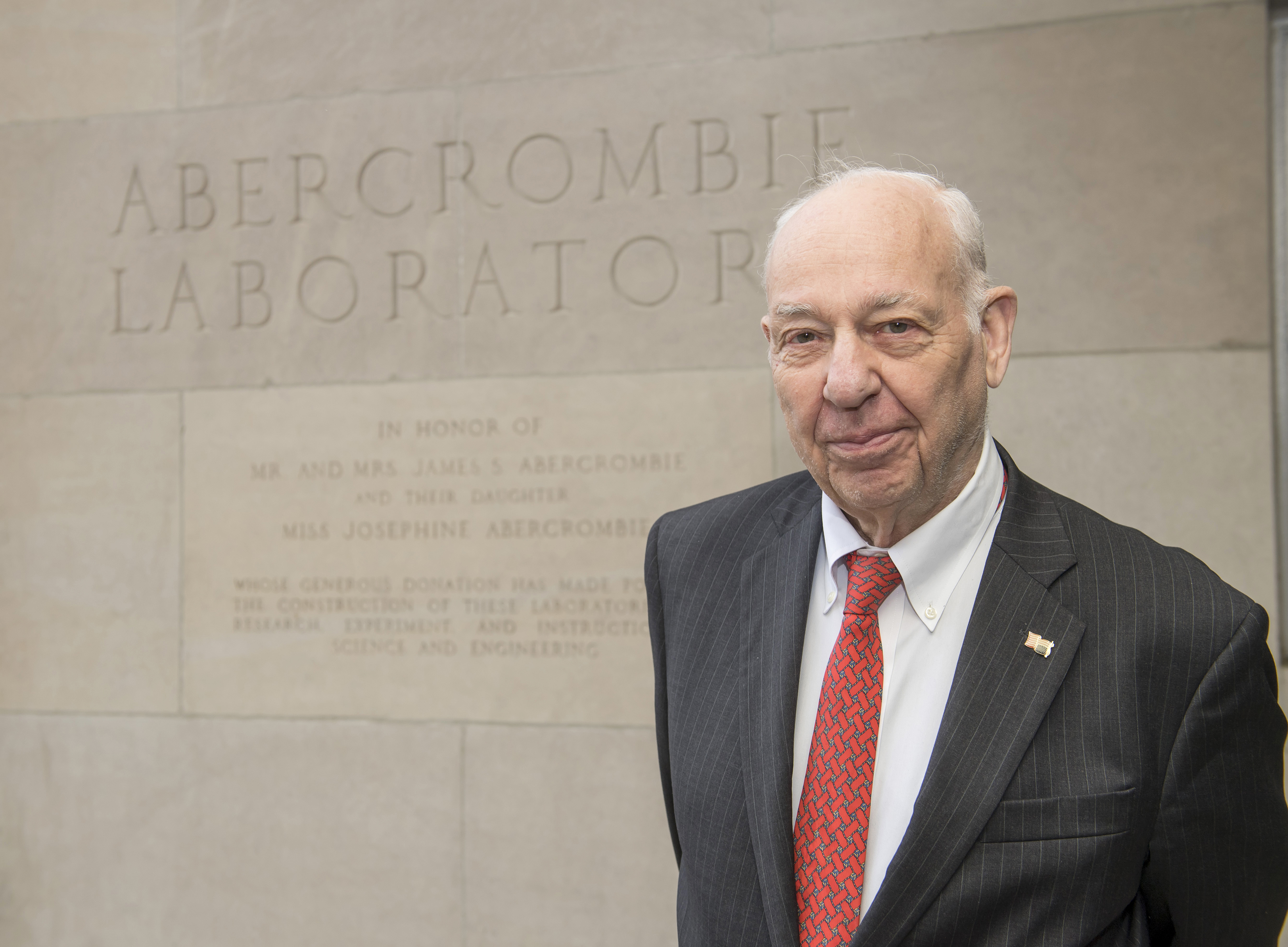
- Tittel in 2019
- Born: Frank Klaus Tittel; November 14, 1933; Oranienburg, Nazi Germany
- Died: February 17, 2026 (aged 92); United States
- Education: University of Oxford
- Known for: Tunable lasers; Laser spectroscopy
- Scientific career
- Fields: Optics, laser science
- Workplaces: Rice University; General Electric; American University in Cairo
- Doctoral students: Lihong V. Wang; Andreas H. Hielscher
- Website: lasersci.rice.edu

Frank Klaus Tittel (November 14, 1933 – February 17, 2026) was a German-born British-American laser physicist, engineer and inventor, who was J.S. Abercrombie Professor of Electrical and Computer Engineering at Rice University. He was best known for his contributions to tunable lasers and laser absorption spectrometry, as well as for the invention of quartz-enhanced photoacoustic absorption spectroscopy.

== Biography ==
Tittel was born on November 14, 1933, in Oranienburg, Germany. His father was an industrial chemist while his mother was Jewish. In 1941, his father died in a skiing accident, while his brother died from an ear infection after being denied medical care due to his heritage. His mother committed suicide in the same year, after their family home was seized by the Nazi Party. During the World War II, he lived with various foster families and in a Czechoslovak camp for orphaned children. In 1948, he moved to England to live with his aunt.

Tittel earned bachelor's and doctoral degrees in physics from University of Oxford in 1955 and 1959, respectively. In 1960, he emigrated to the United States to work as a research scientist with General Electric, where he worked on the recently introduced ruby lasers. Following a short tenure at The American University in Cairo, he joined the Rice University as an associate professor in 1967 and was promoted to a full professor in 1973. Named the J.S. Abercrombie Professor of Electrical and Computer Engineering in 1989, he led the Rice Quantum Institute from 1996 to 2000. Tittel died on February 17, 2026, and was survived by his wife, Maria, as well as by his two sons and two grandchildren.

During his tenure at Rice University, Tittel pioneered tunable lasers, which became a breakthrough in laser spectroscopy. He collaborated closely with Robert Curl and Richard Smalley; his contributions were instrumental in the discovery of buckminsterfullerene, for which Curl and Smalley was awarded the Nobel Prize in Chemistry in 1996. In 2002, he co-invented quartz-enhanced photoacoustic absorption spectroscopy, which was eventually used in the multi-component gas analyzer systems of NASA. He was elected a Fellow of Optica in 1987 for "contributions to the excimer laser and laser spectroscopy." He became a Fellow of SPIE in 2014, and was also a fellow of the IEEE and the American Physical Society. He was awarded the IEEE Medal for Environmental and Safety Technologies alongside Jérôme Faist in 2018 for "his pioneering contributions to optical chemical sensors."

== Selected publications ==
Journal articles

- Heath, J. R.; O'Brien, S. C.; Zhang, Q.; Liu, Y.; Curl, R. F.; Kroto, H. W.; Tittel, F. K.; Smalley, R. E. (1985). "Lanthanum complexes of spheroidal carbon shells". Journal of the American Chemical Society. 107: 7779–7780. doi:10.1021/ja00311a102.
- Liu, Y.; Zhang, Q.-L.; Tittel, F. K.; Curl, R. F.; Smalley, R. E. (1986). "Photodetachment and photofragmentation studies of semiconductor cluster anions". The Journal of Chemical Physics. 85 (12): 7434–7441. doi:10.1063/1.451332.
- Saidi, Iyad S.; Jacques, Steven L.; Tittel, Frank K. (1995). "Mie and Rayleigh modeling of visible-light scattering in neonatal skin". Applied Optics. 34 (31): 7410–7418. doi:10.1364/AO.34.007410.
- Oraevsky, Alexander A.; Jacques, Steven L.; Tittel, Frank K. (1997). "Measurement of tissue optical properties by time-resolved detection of laser-induced transient stress". Applied Optics. 36 (1): 402–415. doi:10.1364/AO.36.000402.
- Kosterev, A. A.; Bakhirkin, Yu. A.; Curl, R. F.; Tittel, F. K. (2002). "Quartz-enhanced photoacoustic spectroscopy". Optics Letters. 27 (21): 1902–1904. doi:10.1364/OL.27.001902.
- Kosterev, Anatoliy A.; Tittel, Frank K.; Serebryakov, Dmitry V.; Malinovsky, Alexander L.; Morozov, Igor V. (2005). "Applications of quartz tuning forks in spectroscopic gas sensing". Review of Scientific Instruments. 76 (4): 043105. doi:10.1063/1.1884196.
- Curl, Robert F.; Capasso, Federico; Gmachl, Claire; Kosterev, Anatoliy A.; McManus, Barry; Lewicki, Rafał; Pusharsky, Michael; Wysocki, Gerard; Tittel, Frank K. (2010). "Quantum cascade lasers in chemical physics". Chemical Physics Letters. 487: 1–18. doi:10.1016/j.cplett.2009.12.073.

Patents

- US 4660210, Tittel, Frank K.; Wilson Jr., William L. & Sauerbrey, Roland A., "Two-halogen donor mixture for XeF (C->A) laser", issued April 21, 1987
- US 4817096, Sauerbrey, Roland A.; Tittel, Frank K. & Wilson Jr., William L., "Multiple wavelength excimer laser", issued March 28, 1989
- US 7869474, Tittel, Frank K., "Fast wavelength tuning techniques for external cavity lasers", issued January 11, 2011
- US 8334980, Tittel, Frank K., "Integrated embedded processor based laser spectroscopic sensor", issued December 18, 2012
- US 11073469, Ma, Yufei & Tittel, Frank K., "Quartz-enhanced photoacoustic spectroscopy gas detection apparatus and method based on beat effect", issued July 27, 2021
