= Batarseh =

Batarseh is a surname. Notable people with the surname include:

- Issa Batarseh, American electrical engineer and researcher
- Victor Batarseh, Palestinian politician
