= Nancy Leveson =

American computer scientist

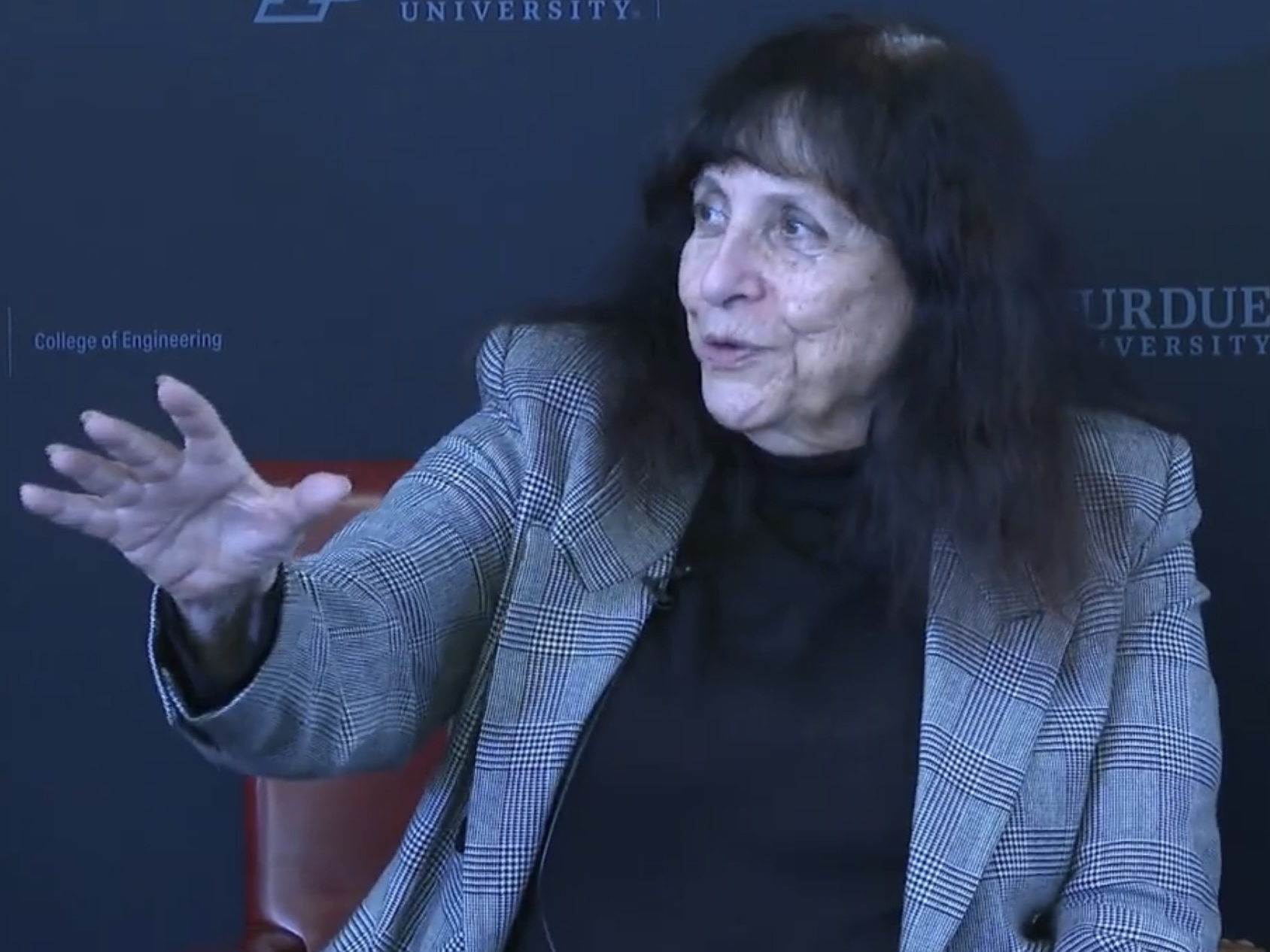
Leveson in 2022

Nancy G. Leveson is an American specialist in system and software safety and a professor of Aeronautics and Astronautics at Massachusetts Institute of Technology (MIT), United States.

Leveson gained her degrees (in computer science, mathematics and management) from University of California, Los Angeles, including her PhD in 1980. Previously she worked at University of California, Irvine, and the University of Washington as a faculty member. She has studied safety-critical systems such as the Traffic Collision Avoidance System (TCAS) for the avoidance of midair collisions between aircraft and problems with the Therac-25 radiation therapy machine.

Leveson has been editor of the journal IEEE Transactions on Software Engineering. She has held memberships in the ACM, IEEE Computer Society, System Safety Society, and AIAA.

== Biography ==
Leveson is Professor of Aeronautics and Astronautics and also Professor of Engineering Systems at MIT. Prof. Leveson conducts research on the topics of system safety, software safety, software and system engineering, and human-computer interaction.

In 1999, she received the ACM Allen Newell Award for outstanding computer science research and in 1995 the AIAA Information Systems Award for "developing the field of software safety and for promoting responsible software and system engineering practices where life and property are at stake." She was elected a member of the National Academy of Engineering (NAE) in 2000 for contributions to software safety.

She has published over 200 research papers and is author of three books, "Safeware: System Safety and Computers" (1995) published by Addison-Wesley; and "Engineering a Safer World" (2012) and "An introduction to system safety engineering" (2023), both published by MIT Press. She consults extensively in many industries on the ways to prevent accidents. In 2005, she received the ACM Sigsoft Outstanding Research Award.

She developed the STPA (System Theoretic Process Analysis) and STAMP (System Theoretic Accident Model and Processes) methodologies for accident analysis.

In 2020, she received the IEEE Medal for Environmental and Safety Technologies for her development of STAMP and other system safety and accident modeling analysis tools.

== Books ==
- Erik Hollnagel, David D. Woods, Nancy Leveson, Resilience Engineering: Concepts and Precepts. Ashgate Publishing, Ltd., 2007. ISBN 978-0-754-68136-6.
- Nancy G. Leveson, Safeware: System Safety and Computers. Addison-Wesley, 1995. ISBN 0-201-11972-2.
- Nancy G. Leveson, Engineering a Safer World: Systems Thinking Applied to Safety. MIT Press, 2011. ISBN 978-0-262-01662-9. Open access pdf downloads of book chapters.
- Leveson, Nancy (2023). An introduction to system safety engineering. Cambridge, Massachusetts: The MIT Press. ISBN 978-0-262-37675-4.
