= George C. Hadjipanayis =

Greek physicist

- Education: University of Athens (B.Sc.), University of Manitoba (M.Sc., Ph.D.)
- Known for: Neodymium magnet
- Scientific career
- Fields: Magnetism, Metallurgy
- Workplaces: University of Delaware

George C. Hadjipanayis is a Greek-American physicist who is the Richard B. Murray Distinguished Professor of Physics Emeritus at the University of Delaware.

Hadjipanayis completed his Bachelor of Science degree in physics at the University of Athens in 1969. He then moved to Canada to pursue further study in the subject, and obtained a Master of Science in 1974, followed by a doctorate in 1979, both from the University of Manitoba. Hadjipanayis formerly taught at the University of Delaware. In 2001, he was elected a fellow of the American Physical Society, "f[or]" his innovative and applicable investigations and development of novel permanent magnets and magnetic nanoparticles.

Together with Masato Sagawa, Hadjipanayis is credited with the discovery of the magnetically hard Nd_{2}Fe_{14}B compound, which forms the basis for all modern Neodymium magnets.
