= Lihong V. Wang =

American optical engineering researcher

- Lihong V. Wang at Rice University
- Citizenship: American
- Education: Huazhong University of Science and Technology; Rice University
- Known for: photoacoustic imaging
- Scientific career
- Fields: Optical engineering
- Workplaces: Washington University in St. Louis; California Institute of Technology
- Thesis: FT-ICR studies of gallium arsenide cluster ions (1992)
- Doctoral advisors: Robert Curl; Richard Smalley; Frank Tittel

Lihong V. Wang (Chinese: 汪立宏) is the Bren Professor of Medical Engineering and Electrical Engineering at the Andrew and Peggy Cherng Department of Medical Engineering at California Institute of Technology and was formerly the Gene K. Beare Distinguished Professorship of Biomedical Engineering at Washington University in St. Louis. Wang is known for his contributions to the field of Photoacoustic imaging technologies. Wang was elected as the member of National Academy of Engineering (NAE) in 2018.

== Education ==
Wang received B.S. and M.S. degrees in optics engineering from Huazhong University of Science and Technology respectively in 1984 and 1987. Wang earned a PhD from Rice University, performing FT-ICR studies of gallium arsenide cluster ions, under the tutelage of Frank Tittel and Nobel Laureates Robert Curl and Richard Smalley.

During his postdoc with Steven L. Jacques at MD Anderson Cancer Center, he developed a widely cited and used Monte Carlo algorithm for light propagation in tissue.

== Career ==
Wang was the recipient of several awards, including NIH's FIRST, NSF's CAREER, NIH Director's Pioneer, and NIH Director's Transformative Research awards. Wang also received the OSA C.E.K. Mees Medal "for seminal contributions to photoacoustic tomography and Monte Carlo modeling of photon transport in biological tissues and for leadership in the international biophotonics community".

Wang has published more than 470 peer-reviewed journal articles including Nature, Science, and PNAS. His book Biomedical Optics: Principles and Imaging was one of the first in the field, and received the Joseph W. Goodman Book Writing Award. Wang was the editor-in-chief of the Journal of Biomedical Optics from 2010 to 2017.

Wang has taught at the McKelvey School of Engineering at Washington University in St. Louis and at the Andrew and Peggy Cherng Department of Medical Engineering at Caltech.

In 2018, Wang was elected as the member of National Academy of Engineering (NAE) for "inventions in photoacoustic microscopy enabling functional, metabolic, and molecular imaging in vivo".

== Awards ==
- 2004: elected Fellow of OSA
- 2010: Joseph W. Goodman Book Writing Award (with Hsin-i Wu)
- 2011: C.E.K. Mees Medal
- 2014: Honorary degree from Lund University
- 2018: Michael S. Feld Biophotonics Award

== See also ==
- Michael Stephen Feld
- The Optical Society
