= Layered materials =

Solids with high anisotropic bonding

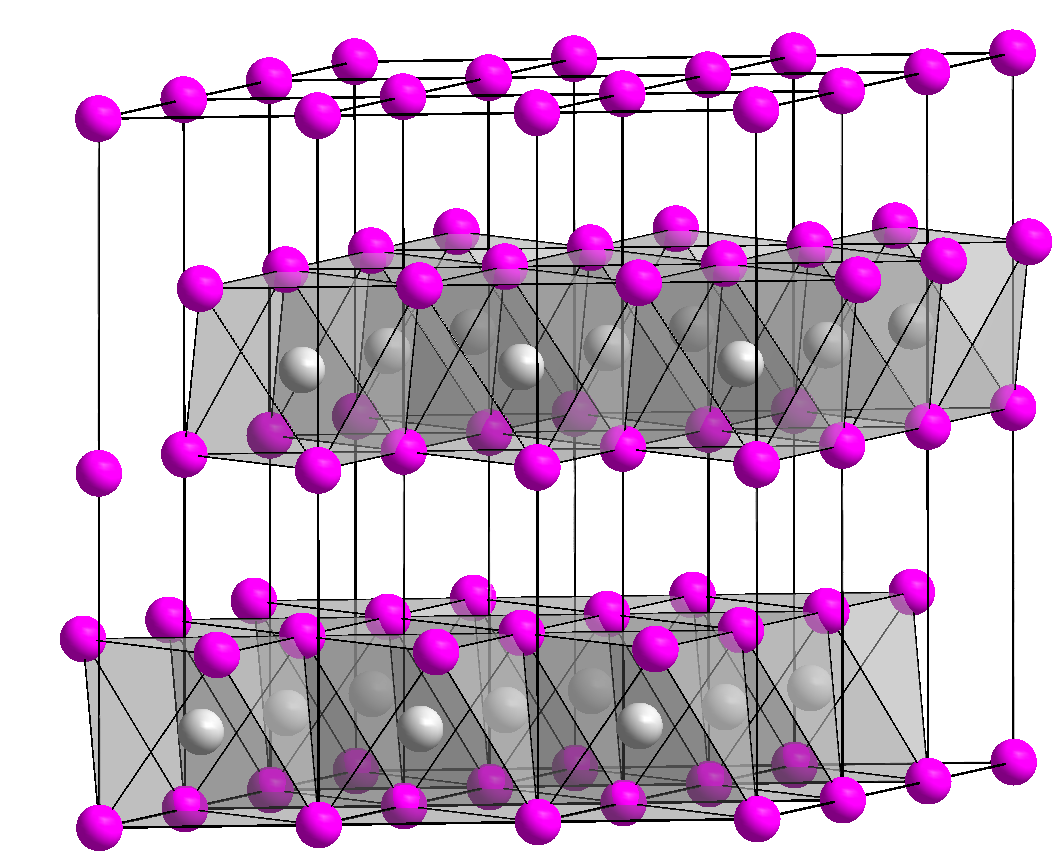
Titanium disulfide is an example of a layered material. The individual sheets are interconnected by van der Waals forces between the sulfide centers.

In material science, layered materials are solids with highly anisotropic bonding, in which two-dimensional sheets are internally strongly bonded, but only weakly bonded to adjacent layers. Owing to their distinctive structures, layered materials are often suitable for intercalation reactions.

One large family of layered materials are metal dichalcogenides. In such materials, the M-chalcogen bonding is strong and covalent. These materials exhibit anisotropic electronic properties such as thermal and electrical conductivity.

== Exfoliation ==
Because the layers bond to each other by relatively weak van der Waals forces, some layered materials are amenable to exfoliation, the complete separation of the layers of the material. Exfoliation can be done using sonication, mechanical, hydrothermal, electrochemical, laser-assisted, and microwave-assisted methods.

Typically aggressive conditions are required involving highly polar solvents and reagents. In the ideal case, exfoliation affords single-layer materials, such as graphene.

== Examples ==
- metal dichalcogenides such as tantalum disulfide, titanium disulfide, and vanadium disulfide.
- Chromium sulfide bromide
- graphite
- iron oxychloride
- layered double hydroxides, ionic solids where intercalated anions are exchangeable.
- Transition metal dichalcogenide monolayers
