= IEEE Medal for Environmental and Safety Technologies =

- Awarded for: Outstanding accomplishments in the application of technology in the fields of interest of IEEE that improve the environment and/or public safety
- Presented by: Institute of Electrical and Electronics Engineers
- First award: 2008
- Website: IEEE Medal for Environmental and Safety Technologies

The Medal for Environmental and Safety Technologies was established by the Institute of Electrical and Electronics Engineers (IEEE) Board of Directors in 2008. This award is presented for outstanding accomplishments in the application of technology in the fields of interest to IEEE, that improve the environment and/or public safety. The medal is sponsored by Toyota Corporation.

The award may be presented to an individual or a team of up to three people.

Recipients of this award receive a gold medal, a bronze replica, a certificate, and an honorarium.

The award was presented for the first time in 2010.

The basis for judging: In the evaluation process, the following criteria are considered: public benefits of the contribution; degree of improvement in important performance metrics; innovative design, development, or application engineering; favorable influence on the contribution to technical professions.

Nomination deadline: 1 July

Notification: Recipients are typically approved during the November IEEE Board of Directors meeting. Recipients and their nominators will be notified following the meeting. Then the nominators of unsuccessful candidates will be notified of the status of their nomination.

Presentation: At the annual IEEE Honors Ceremony

== Recipients ==
- 2026: Wei-Jen Lee
- 2025: Issa Batarseh
- 2024: Hagit Messer
- 2023: Tatsuhiko Fujihira, David James Coe, Gerald Deboy
- 2022: John J. Croat, Masato Sagawa
- 2021: Kaushik Rajashekara
- 2020: Nancy Leveson
- 2019: Richard Nute
- 2019: Ray Corson
- 2019: James Gordon Barrick, Jr.
- 2018: Jérôme Faist
- 2018: Frank Klaus Tittel
- 2017: Alberto Broggi
- 2016: Masahiko Miyaki, Yukihiro Shinohara, and Katsuhiko Takeuchi
- 2015: Rodolfo Schoenburg, Marica Paurevic, and Hans Weisbarth
- 2014: No award
- 2013: Tsuneo Takahashi
- 2012: John Bannister Goodenough, Rachid Yazami, Akira Yoshino
- 2011: Shoichi Sasaki
- 2010: John L. (Larry) Chalfan, Viccy Salazar, and Wayne F. Rifer
