= Chalcogenide =

Class of chemical compounds

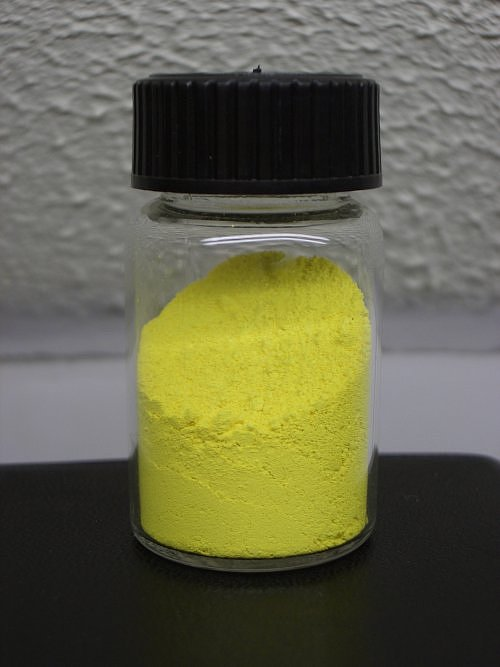
Cadmium sulfide, a prototypical metal chalcogenide, is used as a yellow pigment.

A chalcogenide is a chemical compound consisting of at least one chalcogen anion and at least one more electropositive element. Although all group 16 elements of the periodic table are defined as chalcogens, the term chalcogenide is more commonly reserved for sulfides, selenides, tellurides, and polonides, rather than oxides. Many metal ores exist as chalcogenides. Photoconductive chalcogenide glasses are used in xerography. Some pigments and catalysts are also based on chalcogenides. The metal dichalcogenide MoS_{2} is a common solid lubricant.

== Alkali metal and alkaline earth chalcogenides ==
Alkali metal and alkaline earth monochalcogenides are salt-like, being colourless and often water-soluble. The sulfides tend to undergo hydrolysis to form derivatives containing bisulfide (SH^{−}) anions. The alkali metal chalcogenides often crystallize with the antifluorite structure and the alkaline earth salts in the sodium chloride motif.

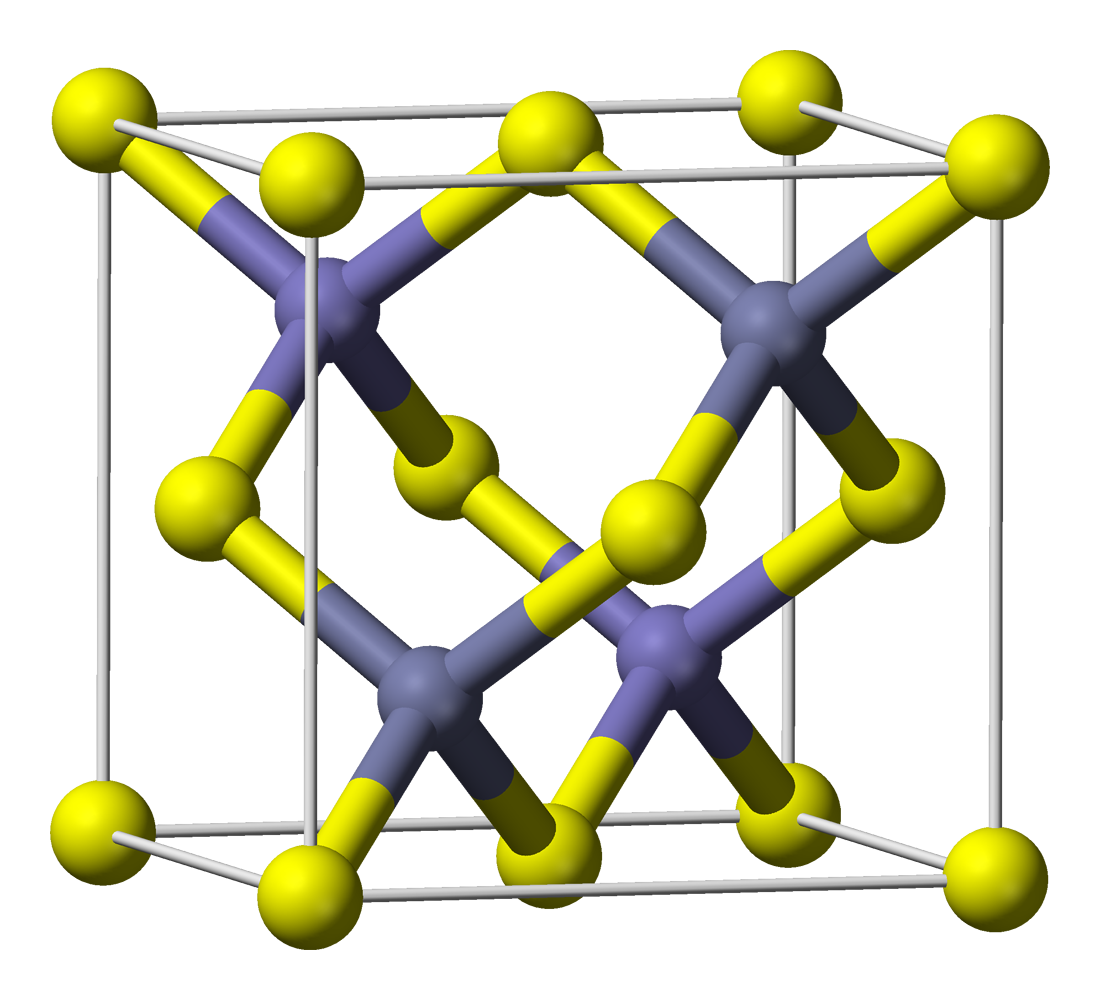
The zinc blende structure is a common motif for metal monochalcogenides.

== Transition metal chalcogenides ==
Transition metal chalcogenides occur with many stoichiometries and many structures. Most common and most important technologically, however, are the chalcogenides of simple stoichiometries, such as 1:1 and 1:2. Extreme cases include metal-rich phases (e.g. Ta_{2}S), which exhibit extensive metal-metal bonding, and chalcogenide-rich materials such as Re_{2}S_{7}, which features extensive chalcogen-chalcogen bonding.

For the purpose of classifying these materials, the chalcogenide is often viewed as a dianion, i.e., S^{2−}, Se^{2−}, Te^{2−}, and Po^{2−}. In fact, transition metal chalcogenides are highly covalent, not ionic, as indicated by their semiconducting properties.

=== Metal-rich chalcogenides ===
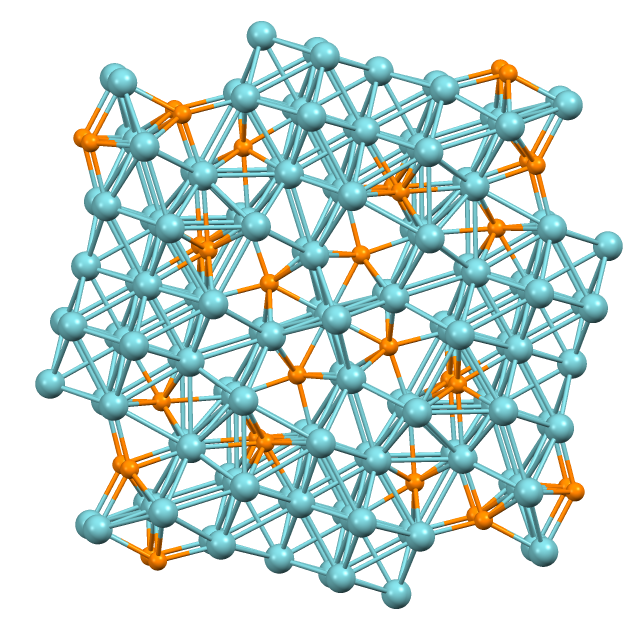
Structure of the metal-rich sulfide Nb_{21}S_{8}.

In most of their chalcogenides, transition metals adopt oxidation states of II or greater. Nonetheless, several examples exist where the metallic atoms far outnumber the chalcogens. Such compounds typically have extensive metal-metal bonding.

=== Monochalcogenides ===
Metal monochalcogenides have the formula ME, where M = a transition metal and E = S, Se, Te. They typically crystallize in one of two motifs, named after the corresponding forms of zinc sulfide. In the zinc blende structure, the sulfide atoms pack in a cubic symmetry and the Zn^{2+} ions occupy half of the tetrahedral holes. The result is a diamondoid framework. The main alternative structure for the monochalcogenides is the wurtzite structure wherein the atom connectivities are similar (tetrahedral), but the crystal symmetry is hexagonal. A third motif for metal monochalcogenide is the nickel arsenide lattice, where the metal and chalcogenide each have octahedral and trigonal prismatic coordination, respectively. This motif is commonly subject to nonstoichiometry.

Important monochalcogenides include some pigments, notably cadmium sulfide. Many minerals and ores are monosulfides.

=== Dichalcogenides ===
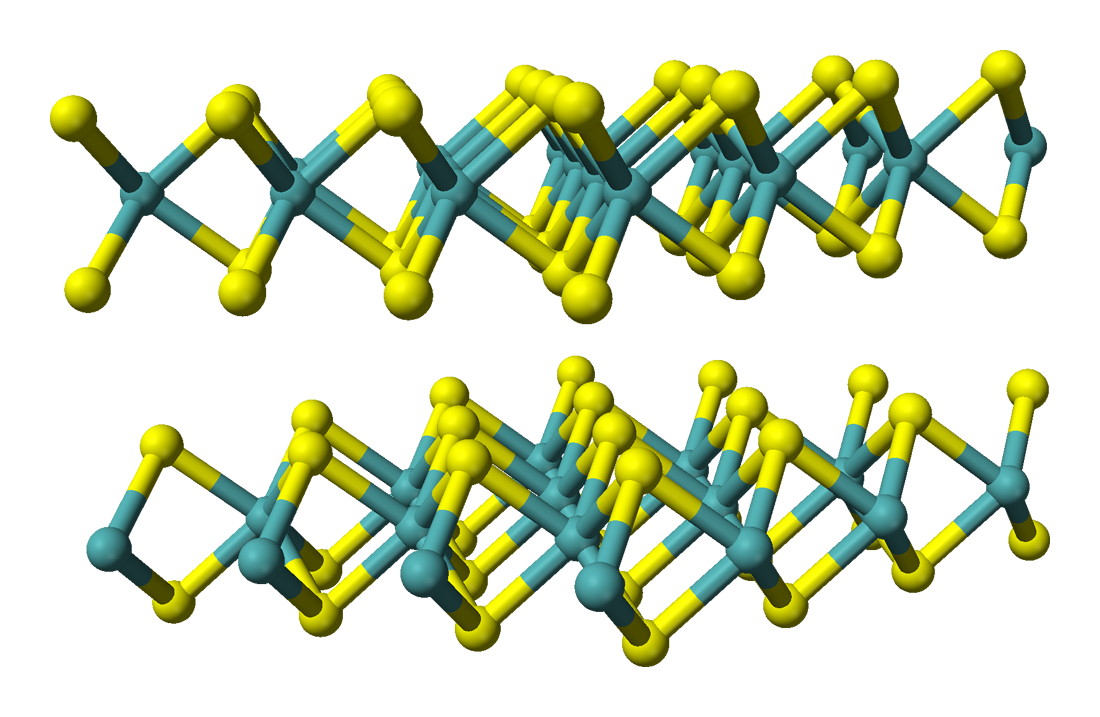
MoS_{2}, the most common metal dichalcogenide, adopts a layered structure.

Metal dichalcogenides have the formula ME_{2}, where M = a transition metal and E = S, Se, Te. The most important members are the sulfides. They are always dark diamagnetic solids, insoluble in all solvents, and exhibit semiconducting properties. Some are superconductors.

In terms of their electronic structures, these compounds are usually viewed as derivatives of M^{4+}, where M^{4+} = Ti^{4+} (d^{0} configuration), V^{4+} (d^{1} configuration), Mo^{4+} (d^{2} configuration). Titanium disulfide was investigated in prototype cathodes for secondary batteries, exploiting its ability to reversibly undergo intercalation by lithium. Molybdenum disulfide is the subject of thousands of articles and the main ore of molybdenum, termed molybdenite. It is used as a solid lubricant and catalyst for hydrodesulfurization. The corresponding diselenides and even ditellurides are known, e.g., TiSe_{2}, MoSe_{2}, and WSe_{2}.

=== Transition metals ===
Transition metal dichalcogenides typically adopt either cadmium diiodide or molybdenum disulfide structures. In the CdI_{2} motif, the metals exhibit octahedral structures. In the MoS_{2} motif, which is not observed for dihalides, the metals exhibit trigonal prismatic structures. The strong bonding between the metal and chalcogenide ligands, contrasts with the weak chalcogenide—chalcogenide bonding between the layers. Owing to these contrasting bond strengths, these materials engage in intercalation by alkali metals. The intercalation process is accompanied by charge transfer, reducing the M(IV) centers to M(III). The attraction between electrons and holes in 2D tungsten diselenide is 100s of times stronger than in a typical 3D semiconductor.

==== Pyrite and related disulfides ====
In contrast to classical metal dichalcogenides, iron pyrite, a common mineral, is usually described as consisting of Fe^{2+} and the persulfido anion S_{2}^{2−}. The sulfur atoms within the persulfido dianion are bound together via a short S-S bond. "Late" transition metal disulfides (Mn, Fe, Co, Ni) almost always adopt the pyrite or the related marcasite motif, in contrast to early metals (V, Ti, Mo, W) which adopt 4+ oxidation state with two chalcogenide dianions.

=== Tri- and tetrachalcogenides ===
Several metals, mainly for the early metals (Ti, V, Cr, Mn groups) also form trichalcogenides. These materials are usually described as M^{4+}(E_{2}^{2−})(E^{2−}) (where E = S, Se, Te). A well known example is niobium triselenide. Amorphous MoS_{3} is produced by treatment of tetrathiomolybdate with acid:

MoS_{4}^{2−} + 2 H^{+} → MoS_{3} + H_{2}S

The mineral patrónite, which has the formula VS_{4}, is an example of a metal tetrachalcogenide. Crystallographic analysis shows that the material can be considered a bis(persulfide), i.e. V^{4+},(S_{2}^{2−})_{2}.

== Main group chalcogenides ==
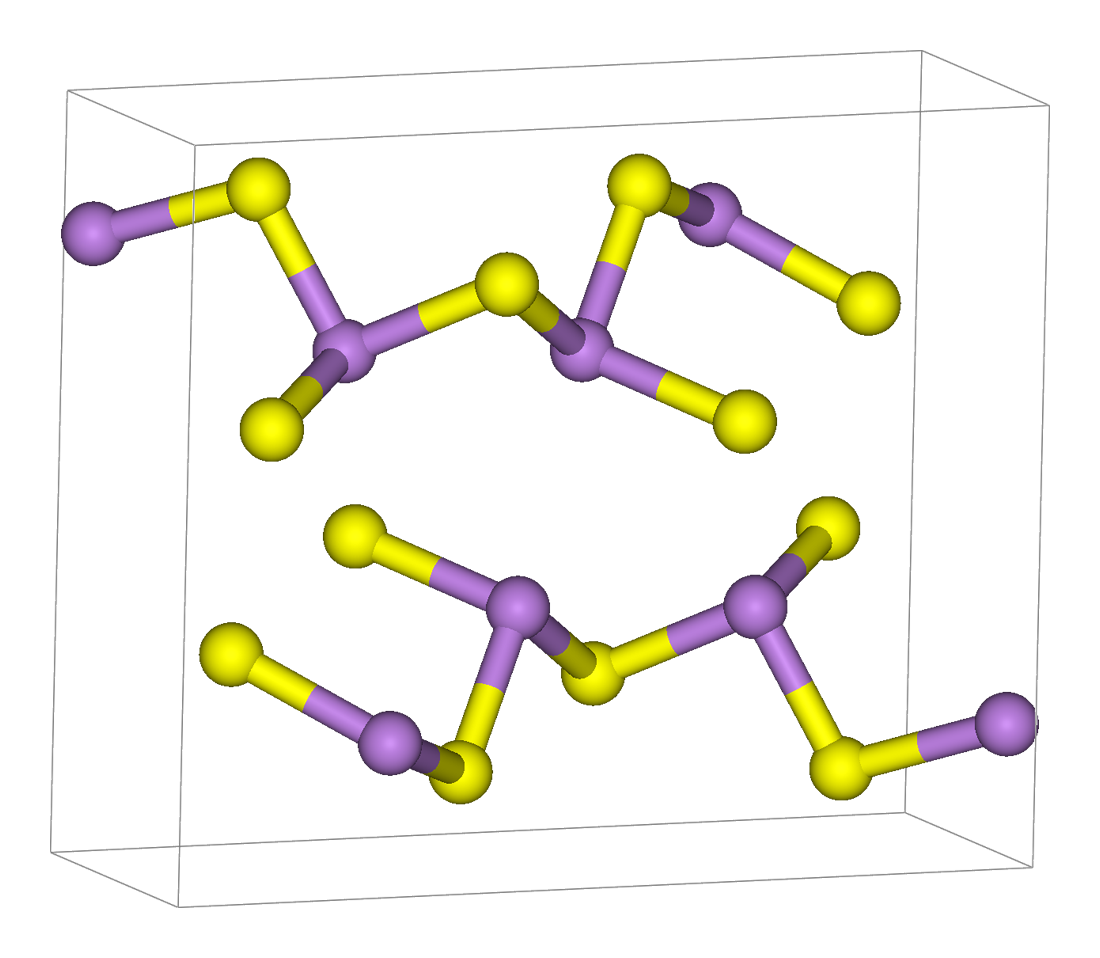
As_{2}S_{3} is a crosslinked polymer where the As and S centers obey the octet rule.

Chalcogen derivatives are known for all of the main group elements except the noble gases. Usually, their stoichiometries follow the classical valence trends, e.g. SiS_{2}, B_{2}S_{3}, Sb_{2}S_{3}. Many exceptions exist however, e.g. P_{4}S_{3} and S_{4}N_{4}. The structures of many main group materials are dictated by directional covalent bonding, rather than by close packing.

The chalcogen is assigned positive oxidation states for the halides, nitrides, and oxides.

== See also ==
- Carbon dichalcogenide
- Chalcogen
- Chalcogenide glass
- Hydrogen chalcogenide
- Negative resistance
- Phase-change memory
