= Carbon dichalcogenide =

Carbon dichalcogenides are chemical compounds of carbon and chalcogen elements. They have the general chemical formula CZ_{2}, where Z = O, S, Se, Te.

This includes:

- Carbon dioxide, CO_{2}
- Carbon disulfide, CS_{2}
- Carbon diselenide, CSe_{2}
- Carbonyl sulfide, OCS
- Carbonyl selenide, OCSe
- Thiocarbonyl selenide, SCSe
- Thiocarbonyl telluride, SCTe

== Stability ==
Double bonds between carbon and chalcogen elements, C=Z, become weaker the heavier the chalcogen, Z. This trend means carbon dichalcogenide monomers are less stable and more susceptible to polymerisation as Z changes from O to Te. For example, CO_{2} is stable, CS_{2} polymerises under extreme conditions, CSe_{2} tends to polymerise, CSeTe is unstable and CTe_{2} does not exist. This trend is an example of the double bond rule.

== Bonding ==
In carbon dichalcogenides, C=O bond lengths are around 1.16 Å, C=S around 1.56 Å, C=Se around 1.70 Å and C=Te around 1.90 Å.

Carbon–chalcogen double bond lengths in carbon dichalcogenides, Z=C=Z′
Species	Formula	Z	Z′	Bond	Bond in molecule	Bond length / Å	Method of determination	Reference
Carbon dioxide	CO_{2}	O	O	C=O	O=C=O	1.163	infrared spectroscopy	
Carbon disulfide	CS_{2}	S	S	C=S	S=C=S	1.553	infrared spectroscopy	
Carbon diselenide	CSe_{2}	Se	Se	C=Se	Se=C=Se	1.689	neutron diffraction	
Carbonyl sulfide	OCS	O	S	C=O	S=C=O	1.158	microwave spectroscopy	
Carbonyl sulfide	OCS	O	S	C=S	O=C=S	1.560	microwave spectroscopy	
Carbonyl selenide	OCSe	O	Se	C=O	Se=C=O	1.159	microwave spectroscopy	
Carbonyl selenide	OCSe	O	Se	C=Se	O=C=Se	1.709	microwave spectroscopy	
Thiocarbonyl selenide	SCSe	S	Se	C=S	Se=C=S	1.553	microwave spectroscopy	
Thiocarbonyl selenide	SCSe	S	Se	C=Se	S=C=Se	1.693	microwave spectroscopy	
Thiocarbonyl telluride	SCTe	S	Te	C=S	Te=C=S	1.557	microwave spectroscopy	
Thiocarbonyl telluride	SCTe	S	Te	C=Te	S=C=Te	1.904	microwave spectroscopy	
