= Steven L. Jacques =

American scientist and engineer

- Born: USA
- Education: Massachusetts Institute of Technology; University of California, Berkeley
- Known for: Monte Carlo simulations of light transport (MCML); Bilirubin concentration technology
- Scientific career
- Fields: Biomedical optics; Biophotonics; Biomedical engineering
- Workplaces: University of Texas MD Anderson Cancer Center; Oregon Health & Science University; Tufts University; University of Washington
- Doctoral students: Andreas H. Hielscher

Steven L. Jacques is an American scientist and engineer recognized as a leading pioneer in the field of biomedical optics and photomedicine. He is a professor of the Practice of biomedical engineering at Tufts University and an Affiliate Professor of Bioengineering at the University of Washington. His contributions have shaped the development of biophotonics and its integration into clinical medicine.

== Education ==
Jacques attended the Massachusetts Institute of Technology (M.I.T.), where he earned a Bachelor of Science degree in biology. He subsequently completed his Master of Science in electrical engineering (MSEE) and his Ph.D. in Electrical Engineering and Biophysics from the University of California, Berkeley. His postdoctoral work was at the Wellman Center for Photomedicine at Massachusetts General Hospital, rising to the position of Lecturer in Dermatology/Bioengineering, Harvard Medical School.

== Career ==
Jacques's academic career spans several major research institutions. Between 1988 and 1996, he established a laboratory developing novel laser and optical methods for medicine at the University of Texas MD Anderson Cancer Center, where he achieved a tenured position as an associate professor. In 1996, he joined the Oregon Health & Science University (OHSU) in Portland, Oregon, where he served for 21 years as a professor of dermatology and biomedical engineering.

While at OHSU, Jacques managed the educational resources for the Oregon Medical Laser Center (OMLC), creating widely used software tools and tutorials for the global biophotonics community. In 2017, he relocated to the Boston area to join the faculty at Tufts University as a professor of the Practice in biomedical engineering. He later took on an additional role as an Affiliate Professor of Bioengineering at the University of Washington in Seattle.

== Research and contributions ==
Jacques's research focuses on the interaction of light with biological tissues, laying groundwork for noninvasive diagnostic technologies and therapeutic optical applications. His research milestones include:

- Monte Carlo Modeling of Light Transport: Together with his postdoc Lihong V. Wang, Jacques co-developed "MCML" (Monte Carlo Modeling of Light transport in multi-layered tissues). This open-source code became the de facto global standard for simulating photon propagation in biological structures.
- Bilirubin Concentration Technology: His laboratory developed a patented, hand-held spectrometer and analysis software to noninvasively measure hyperbilirubinemia in newborns. FDA-approved this technology to replace invasive heel stick tests, and it has been used to screen hundreds of millions of infants worldwide for jaundice.
- Tissue Optical Properties: With over 5800 citations, his 2013 review on the optical properties of biological tissues remains one of the most heavily cited papers in the biophotonics domain.

== Selected publications ==
- Wang, Lihong; Jacques, Steven L.; Zheng, Liqiong (1995). "MCML—Monte Carlo modeling of light transport in multi-layered tissues". Computer Methods and Programs in Biomedicine. 47 (2): 131–146. doi:10.1016/0169-2607(95)01640-F.
- Jacques, Steven L. (2013). "Optical properties of biological tissues: a review". Physics in Medicine & Biology. 58 (11): R37–R61. doi:10.1088/0031-9155/58/11/R37.
- Jacques, Steven L. (1992). "Role of tissue optics in therapy". Medicine and Biology. 115: 45–54.

== Awards and recognition ==
- Fellow of the SPIE (The International Society for Optics and Photonics)
- Fellow of the American Institute for Medical and Biological Engineering (AIMBE)
- SPIE Community Champion (2019) – Awarded for his outstanding service and dedication to the optics community.
- SPIE Britton Chance Biomedical Optics Award (2020) – Awarded for his pioneering technical contributions and foundational work in the field of biomedical optics and tissue laser engineering.
