= Titanium disulfide =

Inorganic chemical compound

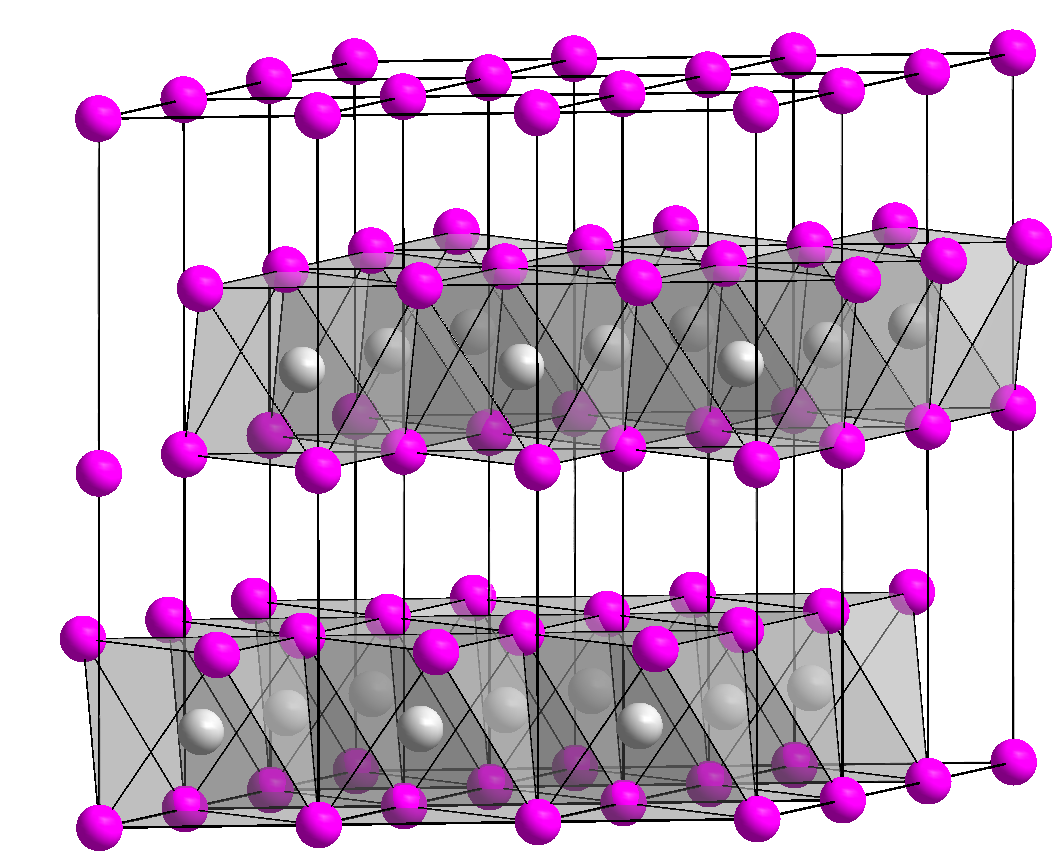

Names
- IUPAC name Titanium(IV) sulfide
- Other names Titanium Sulfide, titanium sulphide, titanium disulfide, titanium disulphide

Identifiers
CAS Number	12039-13-3
3D model (JSmol)	Interactive image
ChemSpider	55461
ECHA InfoCard	100.031.699
EC Number	232-223-6
PubChem CID	61544
UN number	3174 (TITANIUM DISULFIDE)
CompTox Dashboard (EPA)	DTXSID7065203
- InChI: InChI=1S/2S.Ti Key: CFJRPNFOLVDFMJ-UHFFFAOYSA-N
- SMILES: S=[Ti]=S

Properties
Chemical formula	TiS_{2}
Molar mass	111.997 g/mol
Appearance	yellow powder
Density	3.22 g/cm^{3}, solid
Solubility in water	insoluble

Structure
Crystal structure	hexagonal, space group P3̅m1, No. 164
Coordination geometry	octahedral

Related compounds
Other anions	Titanium diselenide
- Except where otherwise noted, data are given for materials in their standard state (at 25 °C [77 °F], 100 kPa). verify (what is ?) Infobox references

Titanium disulfide is an inorganic compound with the formula TiS_{2}. A golden yellow solid with high electrical conductivity, it belongs to a group of compounds called transition metal dichalcogenides, which consist of the stoichiometry ME_{2}. TiS_{2} has been employed as a cathode material in rechargeable batteries.

== Structure ==
With a layered structure, TiS_{2} adopts a hexagonal close packed (hcp) structure, analogous to cadmium iodide (CdI_{2}). In this motif, half of the octahedral holes are filled with a "cation", in this case Ti^{4+}. Each Ti centre is surrounded by six sulfide ligands in an octahedral structure. Each sulfide is connected to three Ti centres, the geometry at S being pyramidal. Several metal dichalcogenides adopt similar structures, but some, notably MoS_{2}, do not. The layers of TiS_{2} consist of covalent Ti-S bonds. The individual layers of TiS_{2} are bound together by van der Waals forces, which are relatively weak intermolecular forces. It crystallises in the space group P3̅m1. The Ti-S bond lengths are 2.423 Å.

Cartoon for intercalation of Li into TiS_{2} cathode. The process involves swelling of one crystal axis and charge transfer from Li to Ti.

=== Intercalation ===
The single most useful and most studied property of TiS_{2} is its ability to undergo intercalation upon treatment with electropositive elements. The process is a redox reaction, illustrated in the case of lithium:

TiS_{2} + Li → LiTiS_{2}

LiTiS_{2} is generally described as Li^{+}[TiS_{2}^{−}]. During the intercalation and deintercalation, a range of stoichimetries are produced with the general formul Li_{x}TiS_{2} (x < 1). During intercalation, the interlayer spacing expands (the lattice "swells") and the electrical conductivity of the material increases. Intercalation is facilitated because of the weakness of the interlayer forces as well as the susceptibility of the Ti(IV) centers toward reduction. Intercalation can be conducted by combining a suspension of the disulfide material and a solution of the alkali metal in anhydrous ammonia. Alternatively solid TiS_{2} reacts with the alkali metal upon heating.

The Rigid-Band Model (RBM), which assumes that electronic band structure does not change with intercalation, describes changes in the electronic properties upon intercalation.

Deintercalation is the opposite of intercalation; the cations diffuse out from between the layers. This process is associated with recharging a Li/TiS_{2} battery. Intercalation and deintercalation can be monitored by cyclic voltammetry. The microstructure of the titanium disulfide greatly affects the intercalation and deintercalation kinetics. Titanium disulfide nanotubes have a higher uptake and discharge capacity than the polycrystalline structure. The higher surface area of the nanotubes is postulated to provide more binding sites for the anode ions than the polycrystalline structure.

== Material properties ==
Formally containing the d^{0} ion Ti^{4+} and closed shell dianion S^{2−}, TiS_{2} is essentially diamagnetic. Its magnetic susceptibility is 9 × 10^{−6} emu/mol, the value being sensitive to stoichiometry. Titanium disulfide is a semimetal, meaning there is small overlap of the conduction band and valence band.

=== High pressure properties ===
The properties of titanium disulfide powder have been studied by high pressure synchrotron x-ray diffraction (XRD) at room temperature. At ambient pressure, TiS_{2} behaves as semiconductor while at high pressures of 8 GPa the material behaves as a semimetal. At 15 GPa, the transport properties change. There is no significant change in the density of states at the Fermi level up to 20 GPa and phase change does not occur until 20.7 GPa. A change in the structure of TiS_{2} was observed at a pressure of 26.3 GPa, although the new structure of the high pressure phase has not been determined.

The unit cell of titanium disulfide is 3.407 by 5.695 angstroms. The size of the unit cell decreased at 17.8 GPa. The decrease in unit cell size was greater than was observed for MoS_{2} and WS_{2}, indicating that titanium disulfide is softer and more compressible. The compression behavior of titanium disulfide is anisotropic. The axis parallel to S-Ti-S layers (c-axis) is more compressible than the axis perpendicular to S-Ti-S layers (a-axis) because of weak van der waals forces keeping S and Ti atoms together. At 17.8 GPa, the c-axis is compressed by 9.5% and the a-axis is compressed by 4%. The longitudinal sound velocity is 5284 m/s in the plane parallel to S-Ti-S layers. The longitudinal sound velocity perpendicular to the layers is 4383 m/s.

== Synthesis ==
Titanium disulfide is prepared by the reaction of the elements around 500 °C.

Ti + 2 S → TiS_{2}

It can be more easily synthesized from titanium tetrachloride, but this product is typically less pure than that obtained from the elements.

TiCl_{4} + 2 H_{2}S → TiS_{2} + 4 HCl

This route has been applied to the formation of TiS_{2} films by chemical vapor deposition. Thiols and organic disulfides can be employed in place of hydrogen sulfide.

A variety of other titanium sulfides are known.

=== Chemical properties of TiS_{2} ===
Samples of TiS_{2} are unstable in air. Upon heating, the solid undergoes oxidation to titanium dioxide:

TiS_{2} + O_{2} → TiO_{2} + 2 S

TiS_{2} is also sensitive to water:

TiS_{2} + 2H_{2}O → TiO_{2} + 2 H_{2}S

Upon heating, TiS_{2} releases sulfur, forming the titanium(III) derivative:

2 TiS_{2} → Ti_{2}S_{3} + S

=== Sol-gel synthesis ===
Thin films of TiS_{2} have been prepared by the sol-gel process from titanium isopropoxide (Ti(OPr^{i})_{4}) followed by spin coating. This method affords amorphous material that crystallised at high temperatures to hexagonal TiS_{2}, which crystallization orientations in the [001], [100], and [001] directions. Because of their high surface area, such films are attractive for battery applications.

=== Unusual morphologoes of TiS_{2} ===
More specialized morphologies—nanotubes, nanoclusters, whiskers, nanodisks, thin films, fullerenes—are prepared by combining the standard reagents, often TiCl_{4} in unusual ways. For example, flower-like morphologies were obtain by treating a solution of sulfur in 1-octadecene with titanium tetrachloride.

==== Fullerene-like materials ====
A form of TiS_{2} with a fullerene-like structure has been prepared using the TiCl_{4}/H_{2}S method. The resulting spherical structures have diameters between 30 and 80 nm. Owing to their spherical shape, these fullerenes exhibit reduced friction coefficient and wear, which may prove useful in various applications.

==== Nanotubes ====
Nanotubes of TiS_{2} can be synthesized using a variation of the TiCl_{4}/H_{2}S route. According to transmission electron microscopy (TEM), these tubes have an outer diameter of 20 nm and an inner diameter of 10 nm. The average length of the nanotubes was 2-5 μm and the nanotubes were proven to be hollow. TiS_{2} nanotubes with open ended tips are reported to store up to 2.5 weight percent hydrogen at 25 °C and 4 MPa hydrogen gas pressure. Absorption and desorption rates are fast, which is an attractive for hydrogen storage. The hydrogen atoms are postulated to bind to sulfur.

==== Nanoclusters and nanodisks ====
Nanoclusters, or quantum dots of TiS_{2} have distinctive electronic and chemical properties due to quantum confinement and very large surface to volume ratios. Nanoclusters can be synthesized using micelle. The nanoclusters are prepared from a solution of TiCl_{4} in tridodecylmethyl ammonium iodide (TDAI), which served as the inverse micelle structure and seeded the growth of nanoclusters in the same general reaction as nanotubes. Nucleation only occurs inside the micelle cage due to the insolubility of the charged species in the continuous medium, which is generally a low dielectric constant inert oil. Like the bulk material, nanocluster-form of TiS_{2} is a hexagonal layered structure. . Quantum confinement creates well separated electronic states and increases the band gap more than 1 eV in comparison to the bulk material. A spectroscopic comparison shows a large blueshift for the quantum dots of 0.85 eV.

Nanodisks of TiS_{2} arise by treating TiCl_{4} with sulfur in oleylamine.

== Applications ==
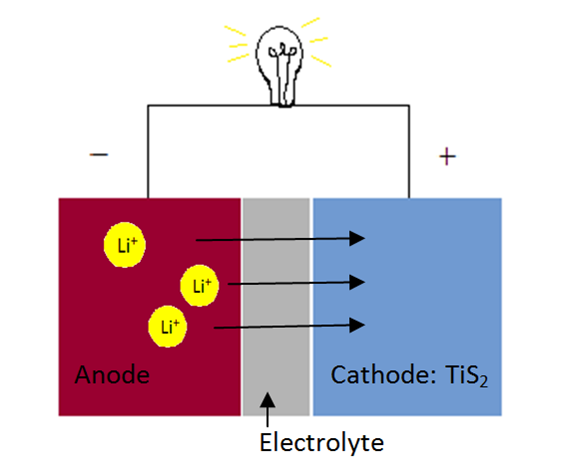
A battery is shown using titanium disulfide as a cathode. Lithium ions intercalate and deintercalate the layered titanium disulfide cathode as the battery is charged and discharged.

The promise of titanium disulfide as a cathode material in rechargeable batteries was described in 1973 by M. Stanley Whittingham. The Group IV and V dichalcogenides attracted attention for their high electrical conductivities. The originally described battery used a lithium anode and a titanium disulfide cathode. This battery had high energy density and the diffusion of lithium ions into the titanium disulfide cathode was reversible, making the battery rechargeable. Titanium disulfide was chosen because it is the lightest and cheapest chalcogenide. Titanium disulfide also has the fastest rate of lithium ion diffusion into the crystal lattice. The main problem was degradation of the cathode after multiple recycles. This reversible intercalation process allows the battery to be rechargeable. Additionally, titanium disulfide is the lightest and the cheapest of all group IV and V layered dichalcogenides. In the 1990s, titanium disulfide was replaced by other cathode materials (manganese and cobalt oxides) in most rechargeable batteries.

The use of TiS_{2} cathodes remains of interest for use in solid-state lithium batteries, e.g., for hybrid electric vehicles and plug-in electric vehicles.

In contrast to the all-solid state batteries, most lithium batteries employ liquid electrolytes, which pose safety issues due to their flammability. Many different solid electrolytes have been proposed to replace these hazardous liquid electrolytes. For most solid-state batteries, high interfacial resistance lowers the reversibility of the intercalation process, shortening the life cycle. These undesirable interfacial effects are less problematic for TiS_{2}. One all-solid-state lithium battery exhibited a power density of 1000 W/kg over 50 cycles with a maximum power density of 1500 W/kg. Additionally, the average capacity of the battery decreased by less than 10% over 50 cycles. Although titanium disulfide has high electrical conductivity, high energy density, and high power, its discharge voltage is relatively low compared to other lithium batteries where the cathodes have higher reduction potentials.

== Notes ==
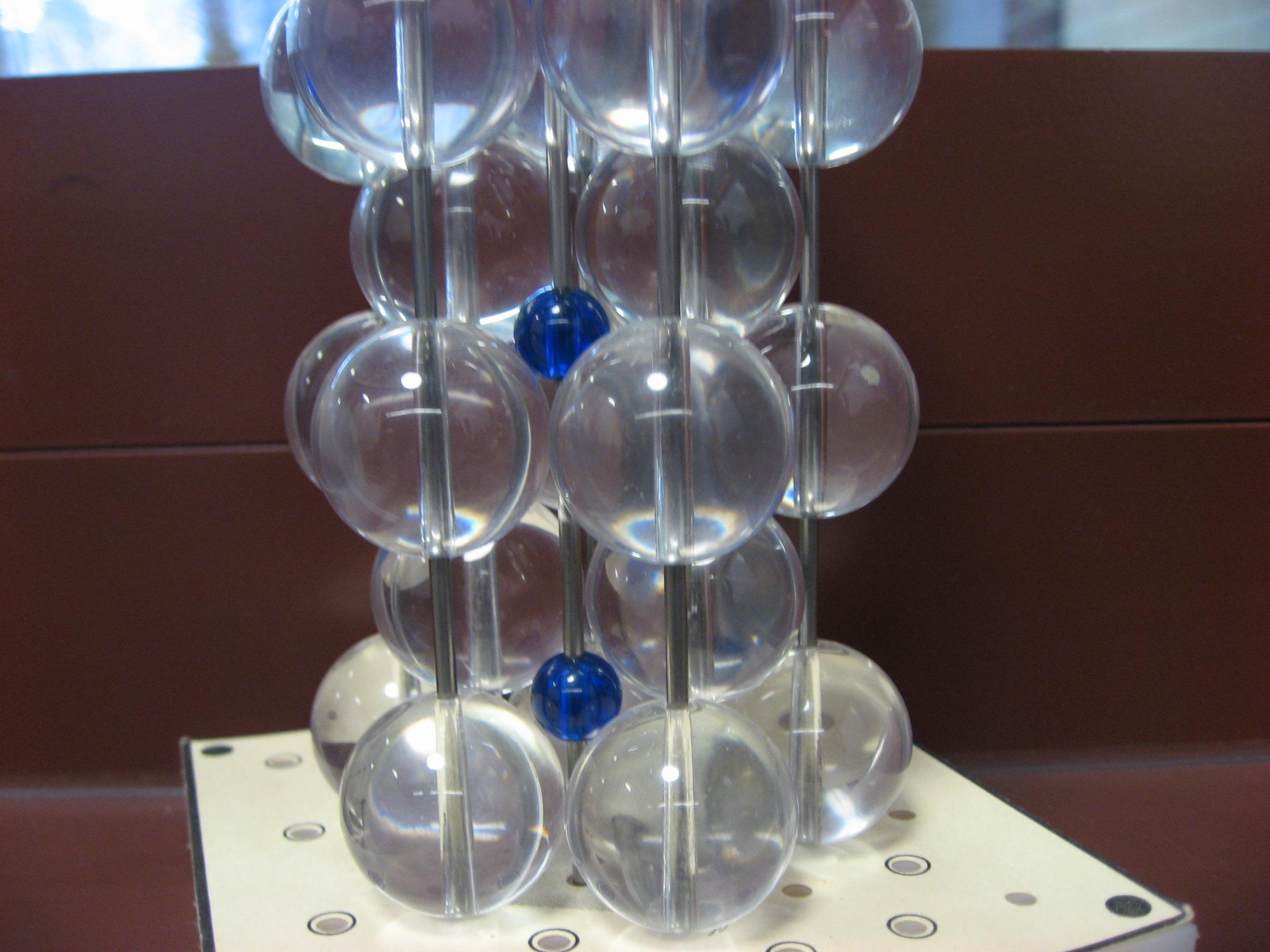
Hexagonal close packed structure of titanium disulfide where blue spheres represent titanium cations and clear spheres represent sulfide anions.
