= Issa Batarseh =

American electrical engineer and researcher

Issa E. Batarseh is a Pegasus Professor in the Department of Electrical and Computer Engineering at the University of Central Florida (UCF) and an affiliated researcher at the Florida Solar Energy Center (FSEC).

== Education and career ==
Batarseh received his Ph.D. in electrical engineering from the University of Illinois at Chicago in 1990. Prior to that, he obtained his B.S. in computer engineering and M.S. in electrical engineering from the University of Illinois at Chicago in 1983 and 1985, respectively. Following graduation, from 1989 to 1990, Batarseh served as a visiting assistant professor at Purdue University in Hammond, Indiana. He was appointed to the University of Central Florida in 1991.

From 2010 to 2014, he served as the president of Princess Sumaya University for Technology in Amman, Jordan, while on professional development leave from UCF. Previously, he served as the associate dean for graduate affairs and the director of the School of Electrical Engineering and Computer Science at UCF. In 1998, he established the Florida Power Electronics Center (FPEC) at UCF with an initial grant from the U.S. National Science Foundation.

== Awards and recognitions ==
- 2008, elected fellow of American Association for the Advancement of Science,
- 2014, became a fellow of the IEEE.
- 2015, elected a fellow of the National Academy of Inventors.
- 2017 inducted into Florida Inventors Hall of Fame in 2017.
- 2025 IEEE Medal for Environmental and Safety Technologies

== Books ==
- Batarseh, Issa (2004). Power Electronic Circuits. John Wiley. ISBN 978-8126548453.
- Muhammad, Rashid H. (2006). Power Electronics Handbook: Devices, Circuits and Applications (Engineering). Academic Press. ISBN 978-0120884797.
