= Rigid-band model =

Models used to describe the behavior of metal alloys

The Rigid-Band Model (or RBM) is one of the models used to describe the behavior of metal alloys. In some cases the model is even used for non-metal alloys such as Si alloys. According to the RBM the shape of the constant energy surfaces (hence the Fermi surface as well) and curve of density of states of the alloy are the same as those of the solvent metal under the following conditions:

1. The excess charge of the solute atoms localizes around them.
2. The mean free path of the electrons is much greater than the lattice spacing of the alloy.
3. The electron states of interest in the pure solvent are all in one energy band, which is greatly separated in energy from the other bands.

The only effect of the addition of the solute, given that its valence is greater than that of the solvent, is the addition of electrons to the valence band. This results to swelling the Fermi surface and filling the density of states curve to a higher energy.

== Theory ==
In a pure metal, because of the periodicity of the lattice, the features of its electronic structure are well known. The single-particle states can be described in terms of Bloch states, the energy structure is characterized by Brillouin zone boundaries, energy gaps and energy bands. In reality though no metal is perfectly pure. When the amount of the foreign element is dilute, the added atoms may be treated as impurities. But when its concentration exceeds several atomic %, an alloy is formed and the interaction among the added atoms can no longer be neglected.

Before giving a more mathematical outline of the RBM it is convenient to give somewhat of a visualization of what happens to a metal upon alloying it. In a pure metal, we'll take silver as an example, all lattice sites are occupied by silver atoms. When different kind of atoms are dissolved into it, for example 10% of copper, some random lattice sites become occupied by copper atoms. Since silver has a valence of 1 and copper has a valence of 2, the alloy will now have a valence of 1.1. Most lattice sites however are still occupied by silver atoms and consequently the changes in electronic structure are minimal.

== Basic concepts behind the Rigid-Band model ==
In a pure metal of valence Z_{1}, all atoms become positive ions with the valence +Z_{1} by releasing the outermost Z_{1} electrons per atom to form the valence band. As a result, conduction electrons carrying negative charges are uniformly distributed over any atomic site with equal probability densities and maintain charge neutrality with the array of ions with positive charges. When an impurity atom of valence Z_{2} is introduced, the periodic potential is disturbed, conduction electrons are scattered and a screening potential is formed

      
  
    
      
        U
        (
        r
        )
        =
        
          
            
              
                e
                
                  2
                
              
              Δ
              Z
              
                e
                
                  −
                  λ
                  r
                
              
            
            r
          
        
      
    
    {\displaystyle U(r)={\frac {e^{2}\Delta Ze^{-\lambda r}}{r}}}
  
[2]

where U(r) is the potential of the electrons in distance r, 1/λ is the screening radius and $\Delta Z=Z_2 -Z_1$.

The Fermi surface of the pure metal is constructed under the assumption that the wave vector k of the Bloch electron is a good quantum number. But alloying destroys the periodicity of the lattice potential and thus results in scattering of the Bloch electron. The wave vector k changes upon scattering of the Bloch electron and can no longer be taken as a good quantum number. In spite of such fundamental difficulties, experimental and theoretical works have provided ample evidence that the concept of the Fermi surface and Brillouin zone is still valid even in concentrated crystalline alloys

In an alloy of atoms A and B, an intermetallic compound super-lattice structure tends to be formed. The chemical bonding between the unlike atoms leads to a very strong potential of the form

      
  
    
      
        U
        (
        
          
            r
            →
          
        
        )
        =
        
          ∑
          
            n
          
        
        
          U
          
            x
          
        
        (
        
          
            r
            →
          
        
        −
        
          
            
              I
              
                n
              
            
            →
          
        
        )
      
    
    {\displaystyle U({\overrightarrow {r}})=\sum _{n}U_{x}({\overrightarrow {r}}-{\overrightarrow {I_{n}}})}
  
[2]

where $U_{x} (\overrightarrow{r} - \overrightarrow{I_n})$ is the potential on position $\overrightarrow{r}$ due to ion X, whose position is specified by $\overrightarrow{I_n}$. X here stands for either A or B, so that $U_{A} (\overrightarrow{r} - \overrightarrow{I_{n}})$ indicates the potential of ion A. The RBM assumes $U_{A}(\overrightarrow{r}) = U_{B}(\overrightarrow{r})$, hence ignores the difference in the potential of ions A and B. Thus, the electronic structure of the pure metal A is assumed to be the same as that of the pure metal B or any compositions in the alloy A–B. The Fermi level is then chosen so as to be consistent with the electron concentration of the alloy.

It is convenient to divide the predictions of the rigid-band model into two categories, geometric and density of states. The geometric predictions are those that use only the geometric properties of the constant energy surfaces. The density-of-states predictions are related to those properties which depend on the density of states at the Fermi energy such as the electronic specific heat.

== Geometric structure ==
In a pure metal the eigenstates are the Bloch functions Ψ_{k} with energies e_{k}. When the periodicity of the pure metal is destroyed by alloying, these Bloch states are no longer eigenstates and their energy becomes complex $e_{k}^{'}= E_{k} + i \Gamma_{k}$

The imaginary part Γ_{k} shows that the Bloch state in the alloy is no longer an eigenstate but scatters into other states with a lifetime of the order of (2Γ_{k})^{−1}. However, if $\Gamma_{k} \ll \Delta$, where Δ is the width of the band, then the Bloch states are approximately eigenstates and they can be used to calculate the properties of the alloys. In this case we can ignore Γ_{k} . The change in the energy of a Bloch state with alloying is then

      
  
    
      
        Δ
        
          E
          
            k
          
        
        =
        
          e
          
            k
          
        
        −
        
          E
          
            k
          
        
      
    
    {\displaystyle \Delta E_{k}=e_{k}-E_{k}}
  
[3]

When the perturbation is fairly localized about the solute site (which is one of the conditions of the RBM), ΔE_{k} depends only on e_{k} and not on k and thus $\Delta E_{k} = \Delta E_{k} (e_{k})$. Therefore, the plot of $E_{k}$ versus k for the alloy will have the same shape of constant energy surfaces as for the plot of $e_{k}$versus k for the pure solvent. A given energy surface of the alloy will naturally correspond to a different energy value from that of the same shaped surface of the pure solvent, but the shapes will remain exactly the same.

== Density of states ==
According to the Rigid Band Model $\Delta E_{k}$ is constant (for a given energy level) and the density of states of the alloy has the same shape as that of the pure solvent, displaced by $\Delta E_{k}$. When the concentration of the solute a is small, $\Delta E_{k}$ is also small and the density of states of the alloy at constant a is

      
  
    
      
        ρ
        (
        E
        )
        =
        
          ρ
          
            o
          
        
        (
        E
        )
        −
        
          
            
              ∂
              
                ρ
                
                  o
                
              
              (
              
                e
                
                  k
                
              
              )
              Δ
              
                E
                
                  k
                
              
            
            
              ∂
              
                e
                
                  k
                
              
            
          
        
        
          |
          
            
              e
              
                k
              
            
            =
            E
          
        
      
    
    {\displaystyle \rho (E)=\rho _{o}(E)-{\frac {\partial \rho _{o}(e_{k})\Delta E_{k}}{\partial e_{k}}}\vert _{e_{k}=E}}
  
[3]

where $\rho_{o}(E)$ is the density of states of the pure solvent.

In the case when $\Delta E_{k}$ is constant we get

      
  
    
      
        ρ
        (
        E
        )
        =
        
          ρ
          
            o
          
        
        (
        E
        −
        Δ
        
          E
          
            k
          
        
        )
      
    
    {\displaystyle \rho (E)=\rho _{o}(E-\Delta E_{k})}
  

meaning that the shape of the density of states will be the same, only displaced by $\Delta E_{k}$.
