= Carbon sulfide selenide =

Names
- IUPAC name Selanylidenemethanethione
- Other names Thiocarbonyl selenide

Identifiers
CAS Number	5951-19-9
3D model (JSmol)	Interactive image
ChemSpider	122247
PubChem CID	138632
- InChI: InChI=1S/CSSe/c2-1-3 Key: UGVGOQWEDNFDPF-UHFFFAOYSA-N
- SMILES: C(=S)=[Se]

Properties
Chemical formula	CSSe
Molar mass	123.04 g·mol^{−1}

Related compounds
Related compounds	Carbon diselenide
- Except where otherwise noted, data are given for materials in their standard state (at 25 °C [77 °F], 100 kPa). Infobox references

Carbon sulfide selenide or thiocarbonyl selenide is a triatomic molecular compound with formula S=C=Se.

== Production ==
Carbon sulfide selenide was made by Henry Vincent Aird Briscoe by passing carbon disulfide vapour over ferrous selenide.

CS_{2} + FeSe → CSSe + FeS

Earlier, it had been made by passing an electric arc through liquid carbon disulfide in the presence of selenium.

== Properties ==
Carbon sulfide selenide appears as a dark yellow oily liquid. Its boiling point is about 83.92 °C at 749.2 mmHg pressure. The density of the liquid at 25 °C is 1.9777 Mg/m^{3}. The Coefficient of cubic expansion is 0.000996.

The liquid does not wet glass. It is immiscible in water, but dissolves in acetone, benzene, bromoform or ethyl alcohol.

The molecule has linear molecular geometry, with a C-S bond length of 1.553 Å and a C-Se bond length of 1.695 Å.

The effect on humans is lachrymatory, the vapour is extremely irritating to mucous membranes, and it smells disgusting.

Microwave spectra
isotopolog	ground state rotational constant MHz	vibration‐rotation constant α_{2} MHz	l‐type doubling constant ql	centrifugal distortion constant Dj kHz
^{32}S^{12}C^{76}Se	2078.190	−4.215	1.041	
^{32}S^{12}C^{78}Se	2060.321	−4.169	1.021	0.22
^{32}S^{12}C^{80}Se	2043.310	−4.133	1.005	0.163
^{32}S^{12}C^{82}Se	2027.113	−4.116	0.996	

Molecular force field for C-Se: 5.72 mdyn/Å and C-S: 7.97 mdyn/Å. Dipole moment is 0.031 D.

== Reactions ==
Carbon sulfide selenide reacts with zinc and hydrochloric acid yielding hydrogen sulfide and hydrogen selenide.

Carbon sulfide selenide reacts with dimethyl acetylenedicarboxylate under high pressure to yield a dithiadiselenafulvalene derivative.

Reduction of carbon sulfide selenide forms a 1,3-dichalcogenole-2-chalcogenone-4,5-dichalcogenolate, but is a mixture of S and Se substances. Selenium is in the 4,5 charged positions.

A reaction with iodine and azide with carbon sulfide selenide results in the formation of selenium.

Carbon sulfide selenide reacts with chlorine gas to form thiocarbonyl tetrachloride and selenium tetrachloride. It does not react with iodine by itself, but only dissolves it.

CSSe + 4 Cl_{2} → ClSCCl_{3} + SeCl_{4}

Carbon sulfide selenide reacts with bromine liquid to form thiocarbonyl tetrabromide and selenium tetrabromide and also some C_{2}S_{2}SeBr_{6}.

CSSe + 4 Br_{2} → BrSCBr_{3} + SeBr_{4}

Carbon sulfide selenide can complex with palladium. It reacts with Pd[P(CH(CH_{3})_{2})_{3}]_{2}, Pd[P(CH(CH_{3})_{2})_{3}]_{3} or Pd[P(C_{6}H_{5})_{3}]_{4}] to displace all but two of the ligands to add CSSe as a bidentate ligand. P(CH(CH_{3})_{2})_{3} also reacts with CSSe to yield [P(CH(CH_{3})_{2})_{3}]^{+}[CSSe]^{−}. For these reactions, methanol can be a solvent. C and Se atoms are ligands to the metal. The bonds in C=S and C=Se are lengthened in the ligand. The bond opposite to the C atom is lengthened.

== Complexes ==
formula	name	structure	comment	reference
C_{5}H_{5}Co(PMe_{3})(η^{2}-CSSe)				
Pd[P(CH(CH_{3})_{2})_{3}]_{2}(η^{2}-CSSe)				
Pd[P(C_{6}H_{5})_{3}]_{2}(η^{2}-CSSe)				
(diphos)Pd(η^{2}-CSSe)				
(dpmb)Pd(η^{2}-CSSe)		P2_{1}/c a=9.585 b=15.02 c=21.50 Å β=103.1°	planar	
Os(η^{2}-CSSe)(CO)(CN-p-tol)(PPh_{3})_{2}				
Os(η^{2}-CSeS)(CO)(CN-p-tol)(PPh_{3})_{2}				
Ru(η^{2}-CSSe)(CO)(CN-p-tol)(PPh_{3})_{2}				
Ru(η^{2}-CSeS)(CO)(CN-p-tol)(PPh_{3})_{2}				
