= Masato Sagawa =

Japanese scientist and entrepreneur

Masato Sagawa 佐川眞人
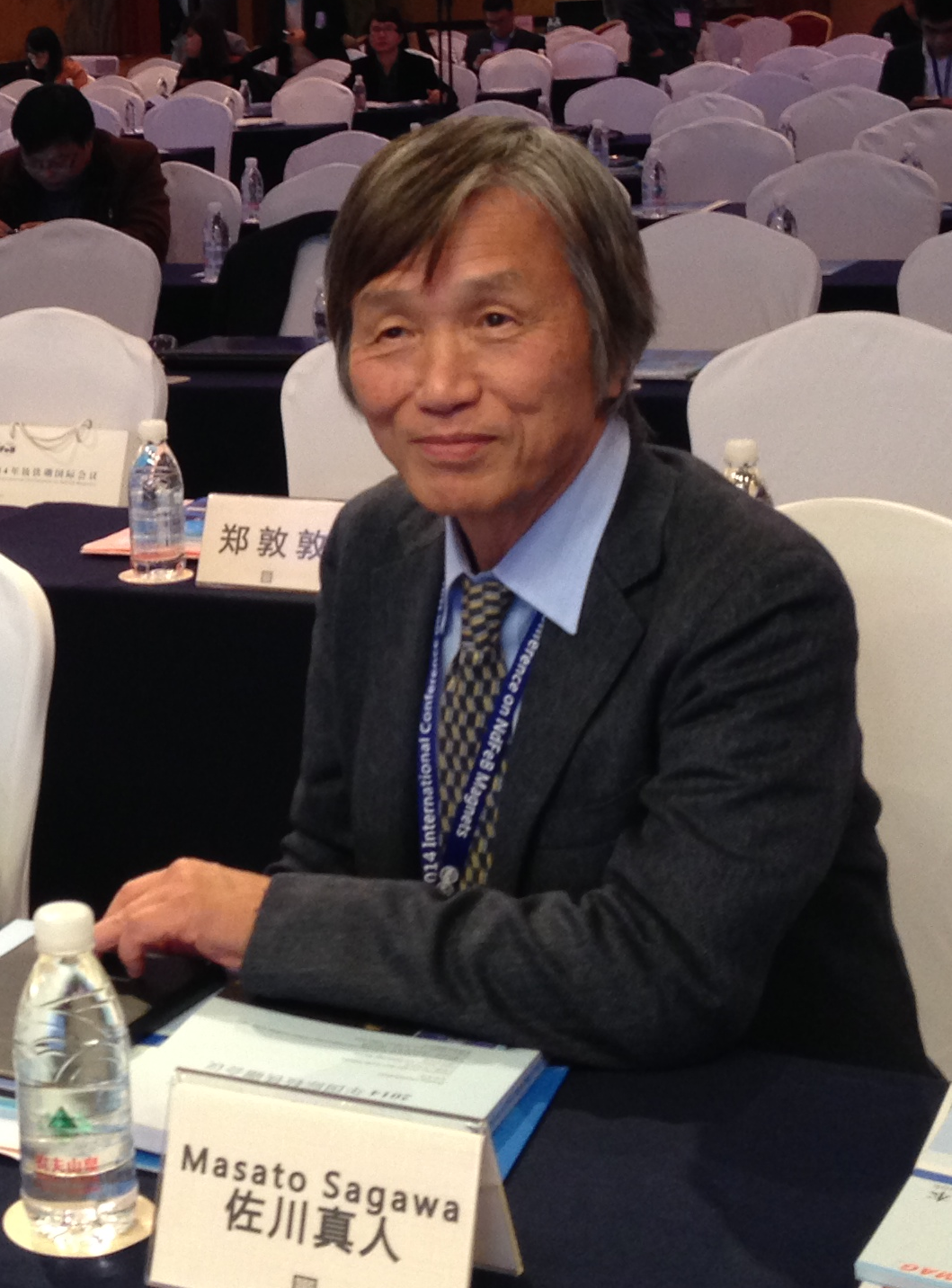
- Sagawa in 2014
- Born: 3 August 1943 (age 83); Tokushima, Japan
- Citizenship: Japan
- Education: Kobe University (B.A.) (M.S.) Tohoku University (Doctor Eng.)
- Spouse: Hisako Sagawa 久子
- Awards: Asahi Prize (1990); Japan Prize (2012); Queen Elizabeth Prize for Engineering (2022)
- Scientific career
- Fields: Metallurgy, magnetic materials, sustainable energy

Masato Sagawa (佐川眞人; born August 3, 1943, in Tokushima, Japan) is a Japanese scientist and entrepreneur, and the inventor of the sintered permanent neodymium magnet (NdFeB). Sagawa was awarded the Japan Prize and IEEE Medal for Environmental and Safety Technologies for his efforts.

== Career ==
Sagawa initially conceived and developed the sintered NdFeB when he was with Fujitsu Laboratories, where he worked from 1972 to 1982. Lacking his supervisor's support for the new magnetic compound, Sagawa resigned in 1981, joining Sumitomo Special Metals. Shortly after joining Sumitomo he had developed the NdFeB magnet. Sagawa presented the new discovery of NdFeB magnet during the Magnetism and Magnetic Materials Conference in November 1983 in Pittsburgh, Pennsylvania. During this same time period, John Croat from General Motors (GM) had independently discovered the same Nd_{2}Fe_{14}B compound.

In 1988, Sagawa founded Intermetallics, a research and development company devoted to the development of neodymium magnets. Sagawa founded NDFEB Corporation in 2012, where he is currently president.

Sagawa has worked on improving the NdFeB magnetic materials' magnetic properties, with over 60 patents for his work related to NdFeB. The 2022 Queen Elizabeth Prize for Engineering was awarded to him for the discovery, development and global commercialisation of the neodymium-iron-boron (Nd-Fe-B) magnet.

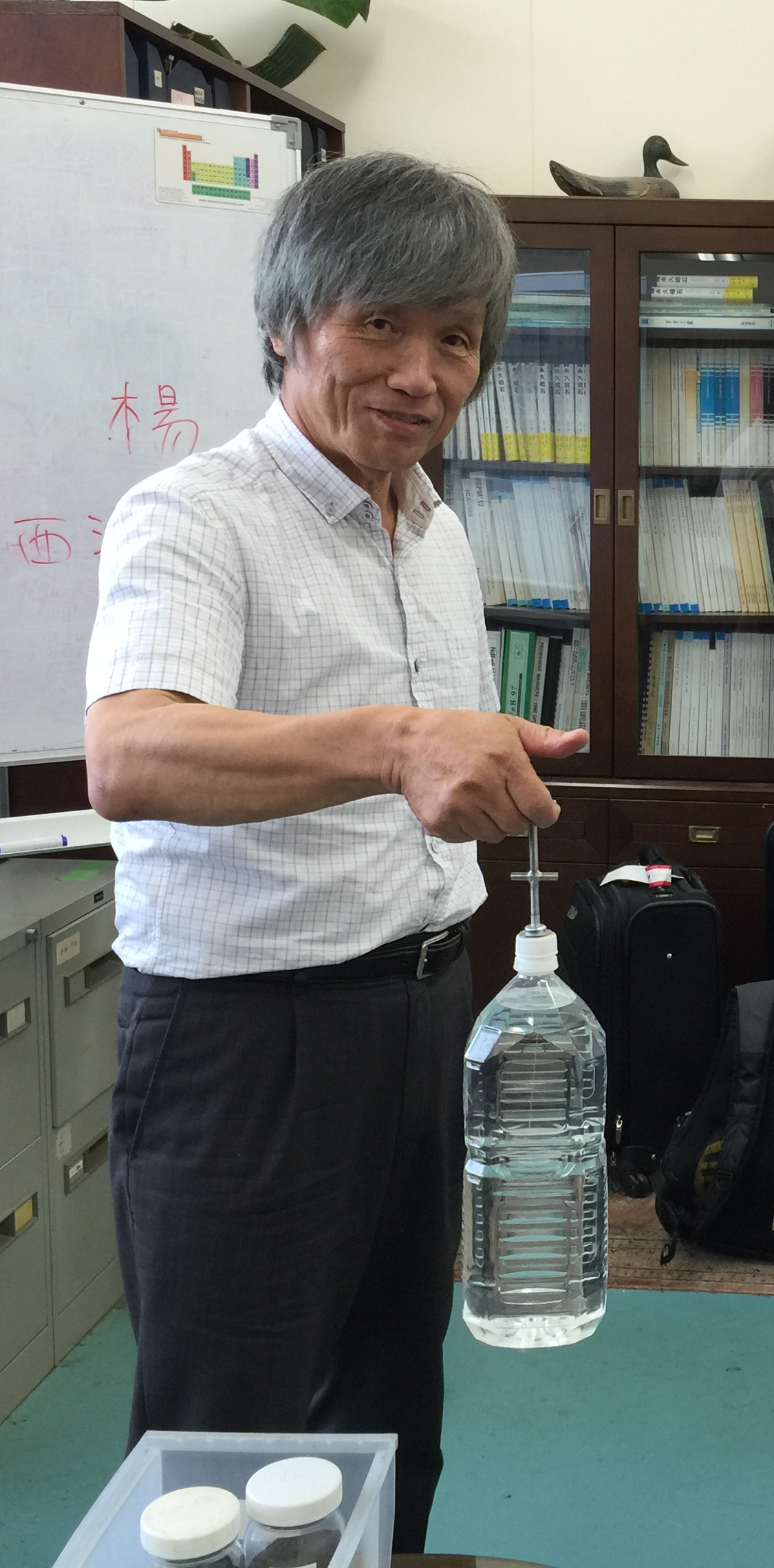
Dr. Sagawa demonstrates how a 1 gram NdFeB magnet disc can firmly hold ~1900 grams of water.

== Major awards and honors ==
- 1986 - James C. McGroddy Prize for New Materials
- 1990 - Asahi Prize
- 2012 - Japan Prize
- 2016 - Nagamori Award
- 2018 - NIMS Award 2018
- 2019 - Yildirim International Entrepreneurship Award from FLOGEN Star Outreach
- 2022 - IEEE Medal for Environmental and Safety Technologies
- 2022 - Queen Elizabeth Prize for Engineering
- 2023 - Honda Prize
- 2023 - IUPAP Magnetism Award and Néel Medal, Germany
- 2024 - European Inventor Award
- 2026 - Person of Cultural Merit
