= Richard Nute =

Richard Nute is an electrical engineer from The Consultant in Bend, Oregon. He was named a Fellow of the Institute of Electrical and Electronics Engineers (IEEE) in 2016 for his contributions to safety engineering of electrical and electronic products.
