= Robert Curl =

American chemist (1933–2022)

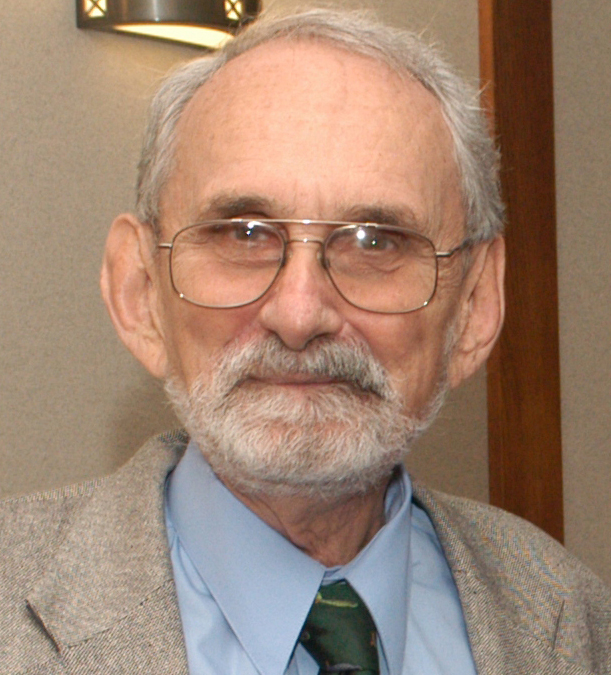
- Curl in 2009
- Born: Robert Floyd Curl Jr. August 23, 1933; Alice, Texas, U.S.
- Died: July 3, 2022 (aged 88); Houston, Texas, U.S.
- Education: Rice Institute, BA; University of California, Berkeley, PhD
- Known for: The discovery of fullerenes
- Scientific career
- Fields: Chemistry
- Workplaces: Rice University, Harvard University
- Thesis: Some spectroscopic and thermodynamic properties of molecules (1957)
- Doctoral advisor: Kenneth Pitzer
- Doctoral students: Lihong V. Wang; James L. Kinsey

Robert Floyd Curl Jr. (August 23, 1933 – July 3, 2022) was an American chemist who was Pitzer–Schlumberger Professor of Natural Sciences and professor of chemistry at Rice University. He was awarded the Nobel Prize in Chemistry in 1996 for the discovery of the nanomaterial buckminsterfullerene, and hence the fullerene class of materials, along with Richard Smalley (also of Rice University) and Harold Kroto of the University of Sussex.

== Early life and education ==
Born in Alice, Texas, United States, Curl was the son of a Methodist minister. Due to his father's missionary work, his family moved several times within southern and southwestern Texas, and the elder Curl was involved in starting the San Antonio Medical Center's Methodist Hospital. Curl attributes his interest in chemistry to a chemistry set he received as a nine-year-old, recalling that he ruined the finish on his mother's porcelain stove when nitric acid boiled over onto it. He is a graduate of Thomas Jefferson High School in San Antonio, Texas. His high school offered only one year of chemistry instruction, but in his senior year his chemistry teacher gave him special projects to work on.

Curl received a Bachelor of Arts in chemistry from Rice Institute (now Rice University) in 1954. He was attracted to the reputation of both the school's academics and football team, and the fact that at the time it charged no tuition. He earned his doctorate in chemistry from the University of California, Berkeley, in 1957. At Berkeley, he worked in the laboratory of Kenneth Pitzer, then dean of the college of chemistry, with whom he would become a lifelong collaborator. Curl's graduate research involved performing infrared spectroscopy to determine the bond angle of disiloxane.

== Scientific career ==
Curl was a postdoctoral fellow at Harvard University with E. B. Wilson, where he used microwave spectroscopy to study the bond rotation barriers of molecules. After that, he joined the faculty of Rice University in 1958. He inherited the equipment and graduate students of George Bird, a professor who was leaving for a job at Polaroid. Curl's early research involved the microwave spectroscopy of chlorine dioxide. His research program included both experiment and theory, mainly focused on detection and analysis of free radicals using microwave spectroscopy and tunable lasers. He used these observations to develop the theory of their fine structure and hyperfine structure, as well as information about their structure and the kinetics of their reactions.

== Nobel Prize ==
Curl's research at Rice involved the fields of infrared and microwave spectroscopy. Curl's research inspired Richard Smalley to come to Rice in 1976 with the intention of collaborating with Curl. In 1985, Curl was contacted by Harold Kroto, who wanted to use a laser beam apparatus built by Smalley to simulate and study the formation of carbon chains in red giant stars. Smalley and Curl had previously used this apparatus to study semiconductors such as silicon and germanium. They were initially reluctant to interrupt their experiments on these semiconductor materials to use their apparatus for Kroto's experiments on carbon, but eventually gave in.

They indeed found the long carbon chains they were looking for, but also found an unexpected product that had 60 carbon atoms. Over the course of 11 days, the team studied and determined its structure and named it buckminsterfullerene after noting its similarity to the geodesic domes for which the architect Buckminster Fuller was known. This discovery was based solely on the single prominent peak on the mass spectrograph, implying a chemically inert substance that was geometrically closed with no dangling bonds. Curl was responsible for determining the optimal conditions of the carbon vapor in the apparatus, and examining the spectrograph. Curl noted that James R. Heath and Sean C. O'Brien deserve equal recognition in the work to Smalley and Kroto. The existence of this type of molecule had earlier been theorized by others, but Curl and his colleagues were at the time unaware of this. Later experiments confirmed their proposed structure, and the team moved on to synthesize endohedral fullerenes that had a metal atom inside the hollow carbon shell. The fullerenes, a class of molecules of which buckminsterfullerene was the first member discovered, are now considered to have potential applications in nanomaterials and molecular scale electronics. Robert Curl's 1985 paper entitled "C60: Buckminsterfullerine", published with colleagues H. Kroto, J. R. Heath, S. C. O’Brien, and R. E. Smalley, was honored by a Citation for Chemical Breakthrough Award from the Division of History of Chemistry of the American Chemical Society, presented to Rice University in 2015. The discovery of fullerenes was recognized in 2010 by the designation of a National Historic Chemical Landmark by the American Chemical Society at the Richard E. Smalley Institute for Nanoscale Science and Technology at Rice University in Houston, Texas.

After winning the Nobel Prize in 1996, Curl took a quieter path than Smalley, who became an outspoken advocate of nanotechnology, and Kroto, who used his fame to further his interest in science education, saying, "After winning a Nobel, you can either become a scientific pontificator, or you can have some idea for a new science project and you can use your newfound notoriety to get the resources to do it. Or you can say, 'Well, I enjoy what I was doing, and I want to keep doing that.'" True to that humility, when asked by the President of Rice what he would like, following the Nobel announcement, he asked that a bike rack be installed closer to his office and laboratory.

== Later research ==
Curl's later research interests involved physical chemistry, developing DNA genotyping and sequencing instrumentation, and creating photoacoustic sensors for trace gases using quantum cascade lasers. He is known in the residential college life at Rice University for being the first master of Lovett College.

Curl retired in 2008 at the age of 74, becoming a University Professor Emeritus, Pitzer-Schlumberger Professor of Natural Sciences Emeritus, and Professor of Chemistry Emeritus at Rice University.

== Personal life ==
Curl married Jonel Whipple in 1955, with whom he had two children. He cycled to his office and lab and every week played bridge with the Rice Bridge Brigade. Curl died in Houston on July 3, 2022, at the age of 88.

== Awards and honors ==
- Clayton Prize, Institute of Mechanical Engineers, 1957
- Alexander von Humboldt Senior US Scientist Award, University of Bonn, Germany, 1984
- Fellow of the National Academy of Sciences, 1997
- Golden Plate Award of the American Academy of Achievement, 1997
- Fellow of the American Academy of Arts and Sciences, 1998
- International Prize for New Materials, American Physical Society, 1992
- Nobel Prize in Chemistry, Royal Swedish Academy of Sciences, 1996
- Johannes Marcus Marci Award in Spectroscopy, 1998
- Centenary Medal, Royal Society of Chemistry, 1999
- Honorary Fellow, The Royal Society of New Zealand, 2001
- University of Bochum Research Prize, 2004
- National Historic Chemical Landmark, American Chemical Society, 2010
- Citation for Chemical Breakthrough Award, Division of History of Chemistry, American Chemical Society, 2015
- Fellow of the Optical Society of America

== Selected publications ==
Journal articles:

- Curl, Robert (1997). "Dawn of the fullerenes: experiment and conjecture". Reviews of Modern Physics. 69 (3): 691–702. Bibcode:1997RvMP...69..691C. doi:10.1103/RevModPhys.69.691.

Technical reports:

- Curl, R. F. and G. P. Glass. "Infrared Absorption Spectroscopy and Chemical Kinetics of Free Radicals. Final Performance Report, August 1, 1985 – July 31, 1994," National Accelerator Laboratory, Rice University, United States Department of Energy, (June 1995).
- Curl, R. F. and G. P. Glass. "Infrared Absorption Spectroscopy and Chemical Kinetics of Free Radicals, Final Technical Report," Rice University, United States Department of Energy, (November 2004).
