= Kink =

Kink or kinks or KINK may refer to:

== Common uses ==
- Kink (sexuality), a colloquial term for non-normative sexual behavior
- Kink, a curvature, bend, or twist

== Geography ==
- Kink, Iran, a village in Iran
- The Kink, a man-made geographic feature in remote eastern Alaska

== Arts, entertainment, and media ==
- Kink (film), a documentary about the internet pornography company Kink.com
- Kink, an autobiography written by Dave Davies, guitarist for the Kinks
- Kink.com, a BDSM-focused Internet pornography company
- The Kinks, a British rock band
  - Kinks (album), a 1964 studio album by the Kinks
- The Kink (novel), a 1927 detective novel by Lynn Brock

=== Radio and television ===
- KinK, a Canadian documentary television series profiling some of the more unusual edges of human sexuality
- KINK and kink.fm, a radio station in Portland, Oregon, United States
- Kink FM, a radio station in the Netherlands

== People ==
- Dick Kink (1921–1971), American politician
- KiNK (Strahil Velchev), music producer and DJ in Sofia, Bulgaria
- George Kink (born 1982), German professional ice hockey player
- Louise Kink (1908–1992), survivor of the sinking of the RMS Titanic
- Marcus Kink (born 1985), German professional ice hockey player
- Rene Kink (born 1956), Australian rules footballer
- Tarmo Kink (born 1985), Estonian professional footballer
- Kink Richards (1910–1976), American football running back

== Physics ==
- Domain wall or kink, a topological solution in various fields of physics
- Kink (materials science), a crystallographic defect
- Kink instability in plasma physics

== Other ==
- Kerberized Internet Negotiation of Keys (KINK), a Kerberos-based protocol used in IPSec
- Sun kink, a buckling of railway tracks caused by high temperature

== See also ==
- Kinki (disambiguation)
- Kinky (disambiguation)
- KNKX (88.5 FM), Tacoma, Washington, USA
- KINX (disambiguation)
- Wink (disambiguation), including callsign INK in region W
