= Tomlinson model =

Physical model in nanotribology

The Tomlinson model, also known as the Prandtl–Tomlinson Model, is one of the most popular models in nanotribology widely used as the basis for many investigations of frictional mechanisms on the atomic scale. Essentially, a nanotip is dragged by a spring over a corrugated energy landscape. A "frictional parameter" η can be introduced to describe the ratio between the energy corrugation and the elastic energy stored in the spring. If the tip-surface interaction is described by a sinusoidal potential with amplitude V_{0} and periodicity a then

$$\eta=\frac{4\pi^2 V_0}{ka^2},$$

where k is the spring constant. If η<1, the tip slides continuously across the landscape (superlubricity regime). If η>1, the tip motion consists in abrupt jumps between the minima of the energy landscape (stick-slip regime).

The name "Tomlinson model" is, however, historically incorrect: the paper by Tomlinson that is often cited in this context did not contain the model known as the "Tomlinson model" and suggests an adhesive contribution to friction. In reality it was Ludwig Prandtl who suggested in 1928 this model to describe the plastic deformations in crystals as well as the dry friction. In the meantime, many researchers still call this model the "Prandtl–Tomlinson Model".

In Russia this model was introduced by the Soviet physicists Yakov Frenkel and T. Kontorova. The Frenkel defect became firmly fixed in the physics of solids and liquids. In the 1930s, this research was supplemented with works on the theory of plastic deformation. Their theory, now known as the Frenkel–Kontorova model, is important in the study of dislocations.
