= Wink (disambiguation) =

A wink is a facial expression in which one eye is briefly closed.

Wink, WINK or Winks may also mean:

== People ==
=== Nickname ===
- Wink Davenport, American volleyball player, father of tennis player Lindsay Davenport
- Wink Hartman, American businessman
- Don Martindale (born 1963), American football coach
- Wink Martindale (1933–2025), US game show host

=== Surname ===
- Wink (surname), a list of people named Wink or Winks

== Technology ==
- Wink (animated file), an instant messaging feature
- Wink pulsing, a signal in telephony
- Wink (platform), a brand of automation products supporting multiple protocols and device makers
- WINKS, a statistical analysis software package

== Entertainment ==
- Wink (duo), a female Japanese pop duo
- Wink (South Korean group), a South Korean trot duo
- Wink (album), a 2021 album by Chai
- "Wink" (song), a song by Neal McCoy
- A disc-shaped playing piece in the game tiddlywinks
- "The Wink" (Seinfeld), an episode of the TV show Seinfeld
- Wink (comics), a Korean comics anthology magazine published by Seoul Munhwasa
- Wink (Marvel Comics), a Marvel Comics supervillain
- Wink (DC Comics), a DC Comics supervillain
- Recording name of DJ Josh Wink
- Wink, a full-length play by Jen Silverman. Premiered in 2019.

== TV or radio stations ==
- WINK-TV, the CBS-affiliated television station for Southwest Florida that is licensed to Fort Myers
- WINK-FM, a radio station licensed to Fort Myers, Florida
- WINK, former call letters for WAXA, a defunct radio station formerly licensed to Pine Island Center, Florida
- WFSX (AM), a defunct radio station (1240 AM) formerly licensed to Fort Myers, Florida, United States, which used the call sign WINK from 1944 until 1999 and from 2003 until 2010
- WINQ-FM ("WINK Country 98.7"), a radio station (98.7 FM) licensed to serve Winchester, New Hampshire, United States
- WNNK-FM ("Wink 104"), a radio station serving the Harrisburg, Pennsylvania, area
- WNKI ("Wink 106"), a radio station licensed to Corning, New York

== Physiology ==
- Anal wink, a reflexive contraction of the external anal sphincter
- A reflexive contraction of the vulvar muscles in mares

== Other uses ==
- Wink (soft drink), a grapefruit based soft drink
- Wink, Texas, a city
  - Wink High School
- Wink Bingo
- Winks, a chain of convenience stores in Canada owned by Alimentation Couche-Tard

== See also ==
- Winx (disambiguation)
- WNKS, former call letters of WNLV, FM station in Charlotte, North Carolina, US
- WNKX (disambiguation), FM and TV stations in Centerville, Tennessee, US
- kink (disambiguation), including callsign INK in region K
