= Leonard Register =

Leonard Register from the University of Texas at Austin was named a Fellow of the Institute of Electrical and Electronics Engineers (IEEE) in 2016 for contributions to modeling of charge transport in nanoscale CMOS devices.
