= NKX =

NKX may refer to:

- Marine Corps Air Station Miramar (IATA airport code NKX), Miramar, San Diego, California, US
- NKX-homeodomain factor
- nkx (trigraph)

== See also ==
- WNKX (disambiguation); including callsign NKX in region W
- KNKX, a radio station with callsign NKX in region K
