= Thomas Dickinson =

Thomas or Tom Dickinson may refer to:

- Thomas Dickenson, or Dickinson, merchant and politician of York, England
- Thomas R. Dickinson, United States Army general
- J. Thomas Dickinson, American physicist and astronomer
- Tom Dickinson (cricketer), Australian-born cricketer in England
- Tom Dickinson (American football), American football player
