= Stick–slip phenomenon =

Motion of objects in sliding contact

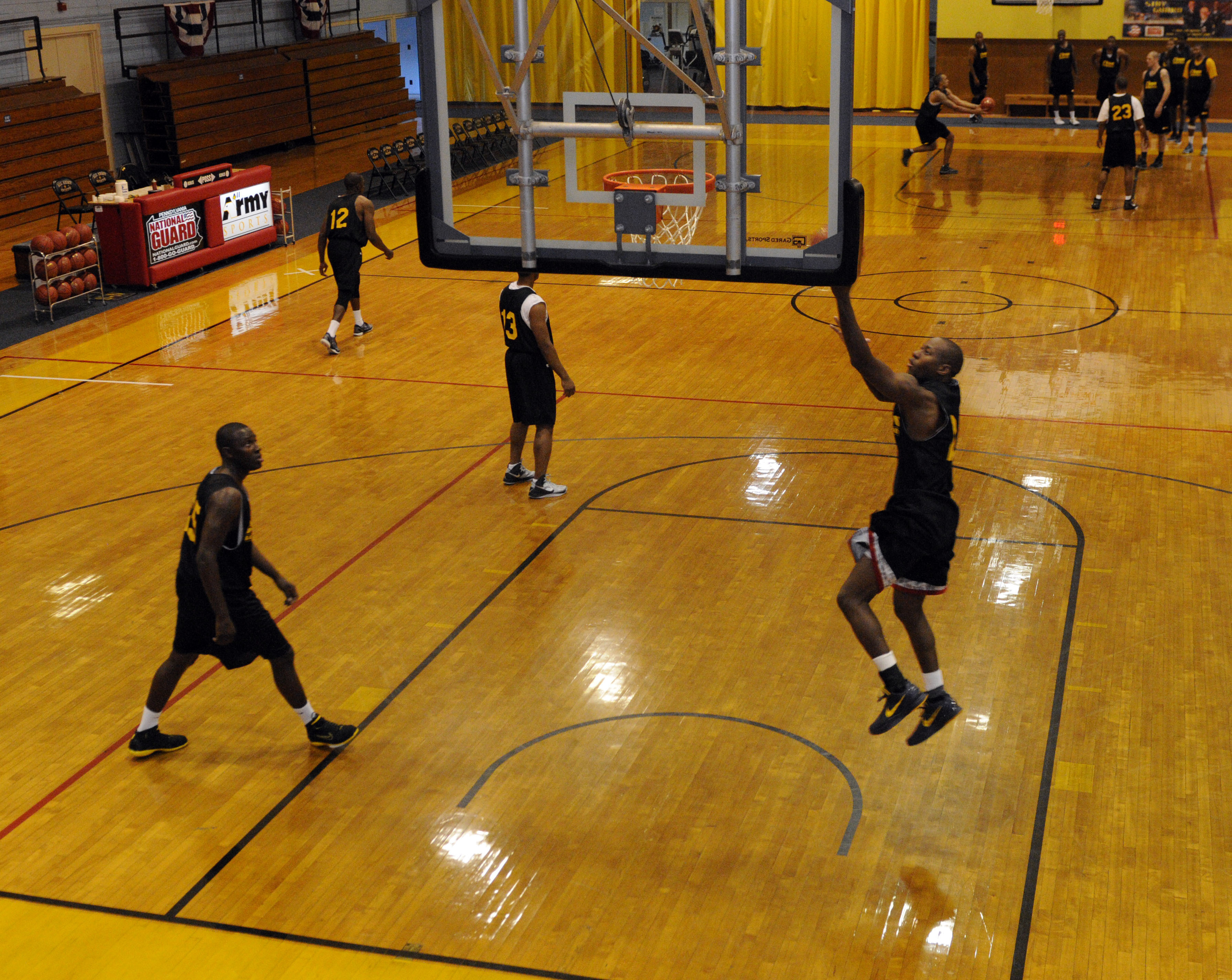
The familiar squeak of basketball shoes on a wooden basketball court is caused by stick–slip motion

The stick–slip phenomenon, also known as the slip–stick phenomenon or simply stick–slip, is a type of motion exhibited by objects in contact sliding over one another. The motion of these objects is usually not perfectly smooth, but rather irregular, with brief accelerations (slips) interrupted by stops (sticks). Stick–slip motion is normally connected to friction, and may generate vibration (noise) or be associated with mechanical wear of the moving objects, and is thus often undesirable in mechanical devices. On the other hand, stick–slip motion can be useful in some situations, such as the movement of a bow across a string to create musical tones in a bowed string instrument.

== Details ==
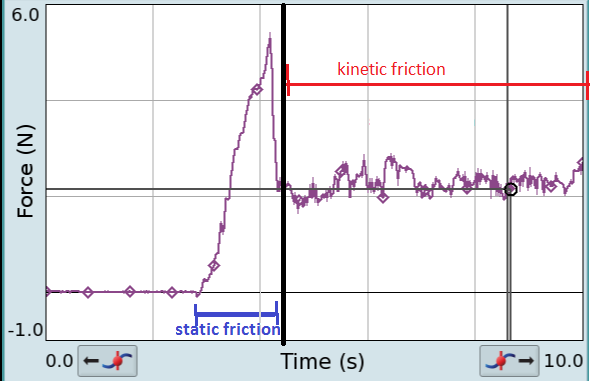
Static kinetic friction vs time

With stick–slip there is typically a jagged type of behavior for the friction force as a function of time as illustrated in the static kinetic friction figure. Initially there is relatively little movement and the force climbs until it reaches some critical value which is set by the multiplication of the static friction coefficient and the applied load—the retarding force here follows the standard ideas of friction from Amontons' laws. Once this force is exceeded movement starts at a much lower load which is determined by the kinetic friction coefficient which is almost always smaller than the static coefficient. At times the object moving can get 'stuck', with local rises in the force before it starts to move again. There are many causes of this depending upon the size scale, from atomic to processes involving millions of atoms.

Model for stick–slip

Stick–slip can be modeled as a mass coupled by an elastic spring to a constant drive force. The drive system V applies a constant force, loading spring R and increasing the pushing force against load M. This force increases until retarding force from the static friction coefficient between load and floor is exceeded. The load then starts sliding, and the friction coefficient decreases to the value corresponding to load times the dynamic friction. Since this frictional force will be lower than the static value, the load accelerates until the decompressing spring can no longer generate enough force to overcome dynamic friction, and the load stops moving. The pushing force due to the spring builds up again, and the cycle repeats.

Stick–slip may be caused by many different phenomena, depending on the types of surfaces in contact and also the scale; it occurs with everything from the sliding of atomic force microscope tips to large tribometers. For rough surfaces, it is known that asperities play a major role in friction. The bumping together of asperities on the surface creates momentary sticks. For dry surfaces with regular microscopic topography, the two surfaces may need to creep at high friction for certain distances (in order for bumps to move past one another), until a smoother, lower-friction contact is formed. On lubricated surfaces, the lubricating fluid may undergo transitions from a solid-like state to a liquid-like state at certain forces, causing a transition from sticking to slipping. On very smooth surfaces, stick–slip behavior may result from coupled phonons (at the interface between the substrate and the slider) that are pinned in an undulating potential well, sticking or slipping with thermal fluctuations. Stick–slip occurs on all types of materials and on enormously varying length scales. The frequency of slips depends on the force applied to the sliding load, with a higher force corresponding to a higher frequency of slip.

== Examples ==
Stick–slip motion is ubiquitous in systems with sliding components, such as disk brakes, bearings, electric motors, wheels on roads or railways, and in mechanical joints. Stick–slip also has been observed in articular cartilage in mild loading and sliding conditions, which could result in abrasive wear of the cartilage. Many familiar sounds are caused by stick–slip motion, such as the squeal of chalk on a chalkboard, the squeak of basketball shoes on a basketball court, and the sound made by the spiny lobster.

Stick–slip motion is used to generate musical notes in bowed string instruments, the glass harp and the singing bowl.

Stick–slip can also be observed on the atomic scale using a friction force microscope. The behaviour of seismically active faults is also explained using a stick–slip model, with earthquakes being generated during the periods of rapid slip.

== See also ==
- Contact mechanics – Study of the deformation of solids that touch each other
- Friction – Force resisting sliding motion
- Lubrication – Presence of a material to reduce friction between two surfaces
- Nanotribology – Study of friction, wear, adhesion and lubrication phenomena at the nanoscale
- Tribology – Science of rubbing surfaces
- Tribometer – Instrument that measures friction and wear between surfaces
