= Kinky =

Kinky often refers to Kink (sexuality), or having unconventional sexual desire(s).

Kinky can also refer to:

== Music and entertainment ==
- Kinky (band), an electronic rock act from Monterrey, Mexico
  - Kinky (Kinky album), their self-titled album
- Kinky (Hoodoo Gurus album)
- Kinky, a 1983 album by Instant Funk
- "Kinky", by Kesha from the album High Road
- MC Kinky, English musician
- Kinky (film), a 2018 American film
- "Kinky" (QI), a 2013 television episode

== Other uses ==
- Kinky Friedman, American singer, novelist and Texas politician
- Kinky Island, an island in Alaska, U.S.
- Kinky, a term used to refer to afro-textured hair.

== See also ==
- Kink (disambiguation)
- Kinki (disambiguation)
- The Quinquis of Spain.
