= Kansai (disambiguation) =

Kansai may refer to:

- Kansai region (Japanese: 関西地方; Kansai-chihō), Honshu, Japan
- Kansai dialect (Japanese: 関西弁; Kansai-ben) of the Japanese language
- Kansai cuisine
- Kansai International Airport (IATA airport code: KIX; ICAO airport code: RJBB) Osaka Bay, Japan
- Kansai University (Japanese: 関西大学; Kansai Daigaku) in Suita, Osaka, Japan
- Kansai Telecasting Corporation (KTV, Kansai TV)
- Radio Kansai (CRK)
- Kansai Main Line (Japanese: 関西本線; Kansai-honsen) rail line
- Kansai Airlines, defunct airline
- Kansai Maru (ship Kansai) shipwrecked freighter

== See also ==
- Kinki (disambiguation), "Kinki" is a nickname for "Kansai"
