= Superlubricity =

Regime of motion with little or no friction

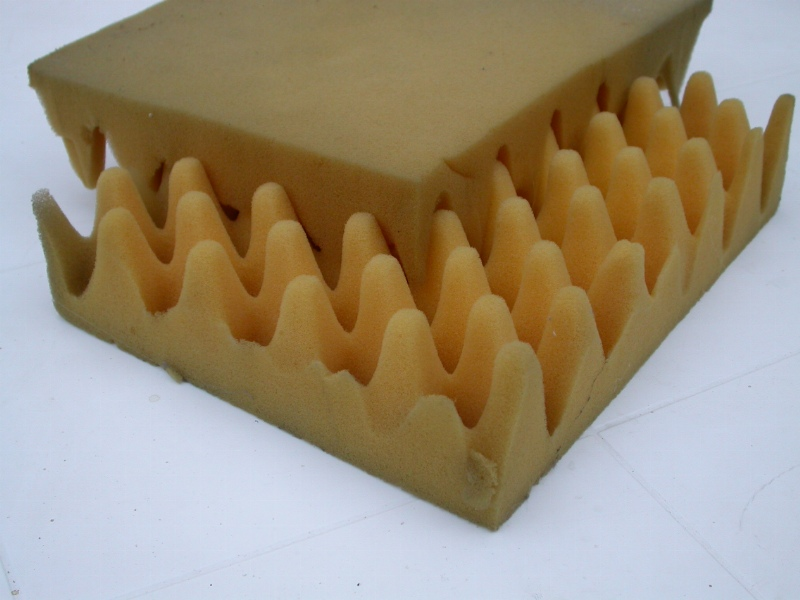
Foam in an egg carton which simulates the atomic surface structure of graphite, commensurable due to alignment in this photo

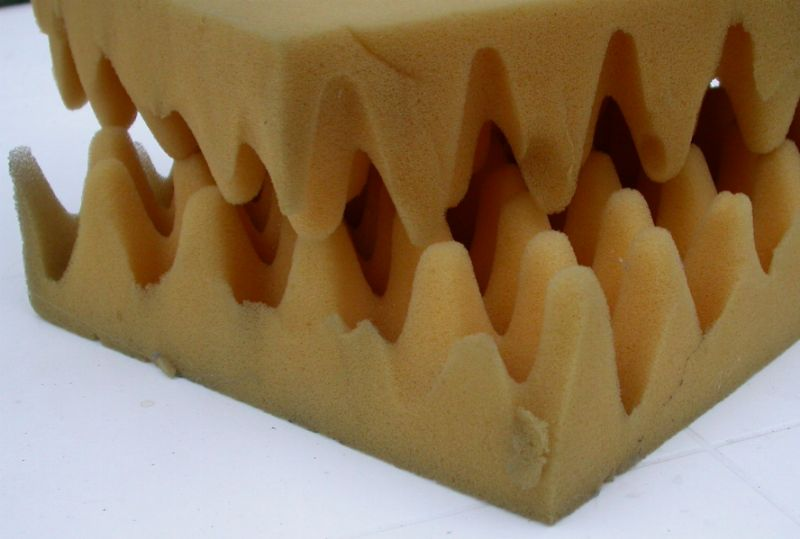
Incommensurable due to twisting, so the valleys and hills don't line up

Superlubricity is a regime of relative motion in which friction vanishes or very nearly vanishes. However, the definition of "vanishing" friction level is not clear, which makes the term vague. As an ad hoc definition, a kinetic coefficient of friction less than 0.01 can be adopted. This definition also requires further discussion and clarification.

Superlubricity may occur when two crystalline surfaces slide over each other in dry incommensurate contact. This was first described in the early 1980s for Frenkel–Kontorova models and is called the Aubry transition. It has been extensively studied as a mathematical model, in atomistic simulations and in a range of experimental systems.

This effect, also called structural lubricity, was verified between two graphite surfaces in 2004. The atoms in graphite are oriented in a hexagonal manner and form an atomic hill-and-valley landscape, which looks like an egg-crate. When the two graphite surfaces are in registry (every 60 degrees), the friction force is high. When the two surfaces are rotated out of registry, the friction is greatly reduced. This is like two egg-crates which can slide over each other more easily when they are "twisted" with respect to each other.

Observation of superlubricity in microscale graphite structures was reported in 2012, by shearing a square graphite mesa a few micrometers across, and observing the self-retraction of the sheared layer. Such effects were also theoretically described for a model of graphene and nickel layers. This observation, which is reproducible even under ambient conditions, shifts interest in superlubricity from a primarily academic topic, accessible only under highly idealized conditions, to one with practical implications for micro and nanomechanical devices.

A state of ultralow friction can also be achieved when a sharp tip slides over a flat surface and the applied load is below a certain threshold. Such a "superlubric" threshold depends on the tip-surface interaction and the stiffness of the materials in contact, as described by the Tomlinson model. The threshold can be significantly increased by exciting the sliding system at its resonance frequency, which suggests a practical way to limit wear in nanoelectromechanical systems.

Superlubricity was also observed between a gold AFM tip and teflon substrate due to repulsive Van der Waals forces and a hydrogen-bonded layer formed by glycerol on the steel surfaces. Formation of the hydrogen-bonded layer was also shown to lead to superlubricity between quartz glass surfaces lubricated by biological liquid obtained from mucilage of Brasenia schreberi. Other mechanisms of superlubricity may include: (a) thermodynamic repulsion due to a layer of free or grafted macromolecules between the bodies so that the entropy of the intermediate layer decreases at small distances due to stronger confinement; (b) electrical repulsion due to external electrical voltage; (c) repulsion due to electrical double layer; (d) repulsion due to thermal fluctuations.

The similarity of the term superlubricity with terms such as superconductivity and superfluidity is misleading; other energy dissipation mechanisms can lead to a finite (normally small) friction force. Superlubricity is more analogous to phenomena such as superelasticity, in which substances such as Nitinol have very low, but nonzero, elastic moduli; supercooling, in which substances remain liquid until a lower-than-normal temperature; super black, which reflects very little light; giant magnetoresistance, in which very large but finite magnetoresistance effects are observed in alternating nonmagnetic and ferromagnetic layers; superhard materials, which are diamond or nearly as hard as diamond; and superlensing, which have a resolution which, while finer than the diffraction limit, is still finite.

== Macroscale ==
In 2015, researchers obtained evidence for superlubricity at microscales, supported by computational studies. The Mira supercomputer simulated up to 1.2 million atoms for dry environments and up to 10 million atoms for humid environments.

== Applications ==
Friction is known to be a major consumer of energy; for instance in a detailed study it was found that it may lead to one third of the energy losses in new automobile engines. Superlubricious coatings could reduce this. Potential applications include computer hard drives, wind turbine gears, and mechanical rotating seals for microelectromechanical and nanoelectromechanical systems.

== See also ==
- Friction force microscopy
- Tomlinson model
