= Kinki (disambiguation) =

Kinki may refer to:

- Kansai region, Japan; also called the Kinki region
- Kindai University, formerly called Kinki University
- Kinki Nihon, baseball team
- Kinki Sharyo, rail equipment manufacturer
- Kinki (film genre), a Spanish film genre focused on delinquents

== See also ==
- Kansai (disambiguation), "Kansai" also called "Kinki"
- Kinky (disambiguation)
- Kink (disambiguation)
