= Winx =

Winx or WINX may refer to:

== Winx Club franchise ==
- Winx Club, an Italian-American animated television series
- World of Winx, an Italian animated television series and a spin-off of Winx Club
- Fate: The Winx Saga, an Italian-British live action television series based on Winx Club
- Winx Club: The Magic Is Back, an Italian animated television series and a reboot of Winx Club
- The Winx, the protagonists and titular characters of the Winx Club franchise

== Radio ==
- WINX-FM, an American radio station
- WLXE, formerly callsigned WINX, an American radio station

== Other uses ==
- Winx (horse) (foaled 2011), Australian racehorse
- Josh Wink (born 1970), also known as Winx, American DJ
- WinX DVD Ripper Platinum

== See also ==
- Wink (disambiguation)
- WNLV, formerly called WNKS, an American radio station
- WNKX (disambiguation)
- KINX (disambiguation)
