= KINX (disambiguation) =

KINX (102.7 FM) is a radio station in Great Falls, Montana, USA

It can also refer to:

- KIMO (107.3 FM), Townsend, Montana, USA; a radio station known as KINX from 2001 to 2011
- Korea Internet Neutral Exchange, a Korean internet exchange service

== See also ==
- KNKX (88.5 FM), Tacoma, Washington, USA
- Kink (disambiguation)
- Winx (disambiguation), including callsign INX in region W
