= Poole–Frenkel effect =

Model in solid-state physics

In solid-state physics, the Poole–Frenkel effect (also known as Frenkel–Poole emission) is a model describing the mechanism of trap-assisted electron transport in an electrical insulator. It is named after Yakov Frenkel, who published on it in 1938, extending the theory previously developed by H. H. Poole.

Electrons can move slowly through an insulator by the following process. The electrons are generally trapped in localized states (loosely speaking, they are "stuck" to a single atom, and not free to move around the crystal). Occasionally, random thermal fluctuations will give an electron enough energy to leave its localized state, and move to the conduction band. Once there, the electron can move through the crystal, for a brief amount of time, before relaxing into another localized state (in other words, "sticking" to a different atom). The Poole–Frenkel effect describes how, in a large electric field, the electron doesn't need as much thermal energy to be promoted into the conduction band (because part of this energy comes from being pulled by the electric field), so it does not need as large a thermal fluctuation and will be able to move more frequently. On theoretical grounds, the Poole–Frenkel effect is comparable to the Schottky effect, which is the lowering of the metal-insulator energy barrier due to the electrostatic interaction with the electric field at a metal-insulator interface. However, the conductivity arising from the Poole–Frenkel effect is detected in presence of bulk-limited conduction (when the limiting conduction process occurs in the bulk of a material), while the Schottky current is observed when the conductivity is contact-limited (when the limiting conduction mechanism occurs at the metal-insulator interface).

== Poole–Frenkel equation ==
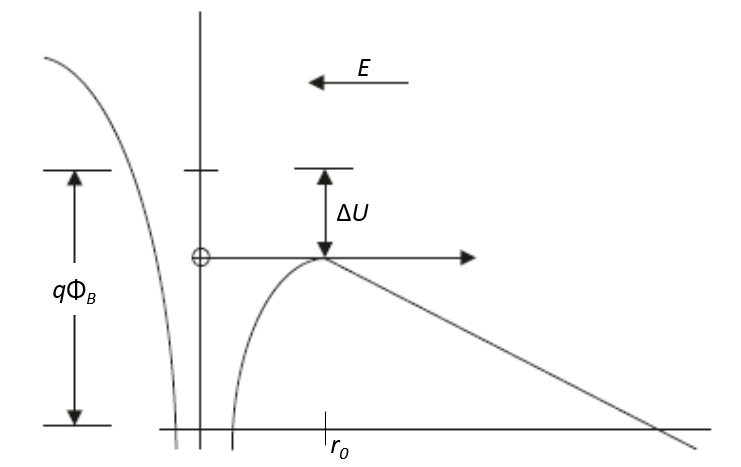
Poole–Frenkel effect for a Coulombic potential well in presence of an applied electric field.

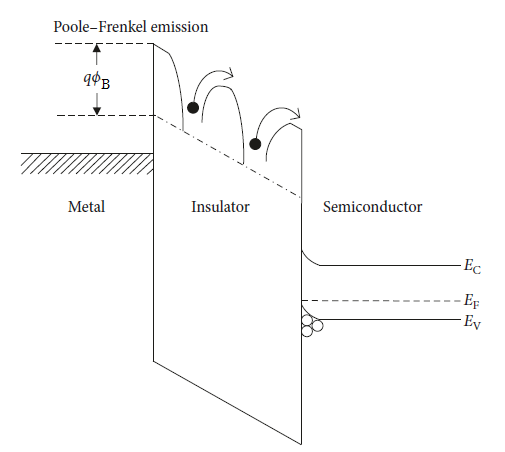
Energy band diagram of Poole–Frenkel emission.

The electrical conductivity $\sigma$ of dielectrics and semiconductors in presence of high electric fields (more than $10^5 V/cm$ for insulators and up to $10^3 V/cm$ for semiconductors) increases approximately as described by the Poole's law (eventually leading to electrical breakdown):

$$\sigma = \sigma_0 \exp{(\alpha E)}$$

where

$\sigma_0$ is the zero-field electrical conductivity
$\alpha$ is a constant
E is the applied electric field.

In this model the conduction is supposed to be carried by a free electron system moving in a self-consistent periodic potential. On the contrary, Frenkel derived his formula describing the dielectric (or the semiconductor) as simply composed by neutral atoms acting as positively charged trap states (when empty, i.e. when the atoms are ionized). For localized trap states with Coulomb potentials, the barrier height that an electron must cross to move from one atom to another is the depth of the trap potential well. Without any externally applied electric field, the maximum value of the potential is zero and is located at infinite distance from the trap center. When an external electric field is applied, the height of the potential barrier is reduced on one side of the trap by the amount

$$\Delta U = q E r_0 + \frac{q^2}{4\pi\epsilon r_0}$$

where:

q is the elementary charge
$\epsilon$ is the dynamic permittivity.

The first contribution is due to the applied electric field, the second is due to the electrostatic attraction between the ionic trap site and the conduction electron. The potential has now a maximum at a distance $r_0$ from the Coulomb trap center, given by $q^2/(4\pi\epsilon r^2_0) = qE$. Therefore $r_0 = \sqrt{q/(4\pi\epsilon E)}$ and

$$\Delta U = q E \sqrt{\frac{q}{4\pi\epsilon E}} + \frac{q^2}{4\pi\epsilon} \sqrt{\frac{4\pi\epsilon E}{q}} = 2\sqrt{ \frac{q^3 E}{4 \pi \epsilon} } = \sqrt{ \frac{q^3 E}{\pi \epsilon} }$$.

This expression is similar to that obtained for the Schottky effect. The factor 2 in the exponent, that makes the barrier reduction in the Poole–Frenkel effect twice larger than that experienced in the Schottky effect, is due to the interaction of the thermally excited electron with the immobile positive charge of the ion acting as a trap center, rather than with its mobile image charge induced in the metal at the Schottky interface. Now if, without any applied electric field, the number of thermally ionized electrons is proportional to

$$\exp \left ( \frac{-q\phi_B}{k_BT} \right )$$

where:

$\phi_B$ is the voltage barrier (in zero applied electric field) that an electron must cross to move from one atom to another in the material
$k_B$ is the Boltzmann constant
T is the temperature

then, in presence of an external electric field the electrical conductivity will be proportional to

$$\exp \left ( \frac{-q \left ( \phi_B-\sqrt{qE/(\pi \epsilon)} \ \right ) }{k_BT} \right )$$

thus obtaining

$$\sigma = \sigma_0\exp \left ( \frac{q\sqrt{qE/(\pi \epsilon)}}{k_BT} \right )$$

differing from Poole's law in the dependence on $E$. Taking everything into account (both the frequency with which electrons are excited into the conduction band, and their motion once they're there), and assuming a field-independent mobility of electrons, the standard quantitative expression for the Poole–Frenkel current is:

$$J \propto E \exp \left ( \frac{-q \left ( \phi_B-\sqrt{qE/(\pi \epsilon)} \ \right ) }{k_BT} \right )$$

where J is the current density. Making the dependences from the applied voltage and the temperature explicit, the expression reads:

$$J \propto V \exp \left ( \frac{q}{k_BT} \left( 2 \sqrt{qV/(4 \pi \epsilon d)} - \phi_B \right) \right)$$

where d is the dielectric thickness. For a given dielectric, different conduction processes may dominate in different voltage and temperature ranges.

For materials such as Si_{3}N_{4}, Al_{2}O_{3}, and SiO_{2}, at high temperature and high field regimes, the current J is likely due to Poole–Frenkel emission. The detection of Poole–Frenkel emission as the limiting conduction process in a dielectric is usually made studying the slope in the so-called Poole–Frenkel plot, where the logarithm of the current density divided by the field ($ln(J/E)$) versus the square root of the field ($\sqrt{E}$) is depicted. The idea of such a plot originates from the expression of the Poole–Frenkel current density, which contains this proportionality ($ln(J/E)$ vs $\sqrt{E}$), and would thus result in a straight line in this plot. For a fixed value of the voltage barrier in absence of any applied electric field, the slope is influenced by just one parameter: the dielectric permittivity. Despite the same functional dependence of the current density upon the electric field intensity, one could differentiate between Poole–Frenkel conduction upon Schottky conduction as they would result in straight lines with different slopes in a Poole–Frenkel plot. The theoretical slopes can be evaluated knowing the high frequency dielectric constant of the material ($\kappa = \epsilon / \epsilon_0$, where $\epsilon_0$ is the vacuum permittivity), and comparing these with the slopes detected experimentally. As an alternative, one can evaluate the value for $\kappa$ equating the theoretical slopes to the experimental detected ones, provided that it is known if the conductivity is electrode-limited or bulk-limited. Such a value of the high frequency dielectric constant should then conform the relation $\kappa = n^2$, where $n$ is the refractive index of the material.

== Improved Poole–Frenkel models ==
Although many progresses have been made on the topic since the classical work of Frenkel, the Poole–Frenkel formula has been spreadly used to interpret several non-ohmic experimental currents observed in dielectrics and also semiconductors. The debate about the underlying assumptions of the classical Poole–Frenkel model has given life to several improved Poole–Frenkel models. These hypotheses are presented in the following.

Only electron (single-carrier) conduction is considered, assuming the existence of ohmic contacts capable to refill detrapped electrons at the electrodes, and space charge effects are neglected, supposing that the field is uniform. A revisitation of this latter assumption can be found, for example, in the "theory of space charge limited current enhanced by Frenkel effect" developed by Murgatroyd.

The carriers mobility is assumed to be field-independent. Neglecting every kind of diffusion process for the de-trapped carriers, the pre-exponential factor in the Poole–Frenkel formula is thus proportional to $E$. This depiction would be suitable for the description of the conduction either in dielectrics or semiconductors. However, Poole–Frenkel effect is likely to be observed only in materials characterized by low mobility values, for, in high mobility solids, the re-trapping of carriers would be gradually inhibited by carrier depletion. Still, different dependences of the pre-exponential factor from the field can be found: assuming that the carriers could be re-trapped, proportionality to $E^{-1/2}$ or $E^{1/2}$ is obtained, depending on the electron retrapping occurring by the nearest neighbouring trap or after a drift. Moreover, a pre-exponential factor proportional to $E^{1/2}$ is found to be the result of random diffusion processes, while dependencies on $E^{-3/2}$ and $E^{-3/4}$ are found to be the result of hopping and diffusion transport processes respectively.

In the classical Poole–Frenkel theory a Coulombic trap potential is assumed, but steeper potentials belonging to multipolar defects or screened hydrogenic potentials are considered as well.

Regarding the typology of traps, the Poole–Frenkel effect is described to occur for positively charged trap sites, i.e. for traps that are positive when empty and neutral when filled, in order for the electron to experience a Coulombic potential barrier due to the interaction with the positively charged trap. Donors or acceptors sites and electrons in the valence band will also exhibit the Poole–Frenkel effect as well. On the contrary, a neutral trap site, i.e. a site that is neutral when empty and charged (negatively for electrons) when filled, will not exhibit Poole–Frenkel effect. Among the others, Simmons has proposed an alternative to the classical model with shallow neutral traps and deep donors, capable to exhibit a bulk-limited conduction with a Schottky electric field dependence, even in presence of a Poole–Frenkel conduction mechanism, thus explaining the "anomalous Poole–Frenkel effect" revealed by Ta_{2}O_{5} and SiO films. Models there exist that consider the presence of both donor and acceptor trap sites, in a situation called compensation of traps. The model of Yeargan and Taylor, for example, extends the classical Poole–Frenkel theory including diverse degrees of compensations: when only one kind of trap is considered, the slope of the curve in a Poole–Frenkel plot reproduces that obtained from Schottky emission, in spite of the barrier lowering being twice that for Schottky effect; the slope is twice larger in presence of compensation.

As a further assumption a single energy level for the traps is assumed. However, the existence of further donor levels is discussed, even if they are supposed to be entirely filled for every field and temperature regime, and thus to not furnish any conduction carrier (this is equivalent to state that the additional donor levels are placed well below the Fermi level).

=== Hartke's equation ===
The calculation made for the trap depth reduction is a one-dimensional calculation, resulting in an overestimation of the effective barrier lowering. In fact, only in the direction of the external electric field the potential well height is lowered as much estimated accordingly to the Poole–Frenkel expression. More accurate calculation, performed by Hartke making an average of the electron emission probabilities with respect to any direction, shows that the growth of the free carriers concentration is about an order of magnitude less than that predicted by Poole–Frenkel equation. The Hartke equation is equivalent to

$$J \propto E \exp \left ( \frac{-q\phi_B}{k_BT} \right )\left( \frac{1}{2} + \frac{1}{\beta^2 E}\left(1 + \left(\beta \sqrt{E}-1 \right)\exp(\beta \sqrt{E}) \right) \right)$$

where

$$\beta = \frac{q}{k_BT} \sqrt{ \frac{q}{\pi \epsilon} }$$.

From a theoretical point of view, Hartke's expression has to be preferred to Poole–Frenkel equation on the grounds that the threedimensionality of the problem of the trap barrier lowering is considered. Additional three-dimensional models have been developed, differing by the treatment they do of the emission process in the upwind direction. Ieda, Sawa, and Kato, for example, have proposed a model that includes the barrier variation in directions both forward and opposite to the electric field.

=== Poole–Frenkel saturation ===
Poole–Frenkel saturation occurs when all the trap sites become ionized, resulting in a maximum of the number of conduction carriers. The corresponding saturation field is obtained from the expression describing the vanishing of the barrier:

$$\phi_B - \sqrt{ \frac{qE_s}{\pi \epsilon} } = 0$$

where $E_s$ is the saturation field. Thus

$$E_s = \frac{\pi \epsilon {\phi_B}^2}{q}$$.

The trap sites are now necessarily empty, being at the edge of the conduction band. The fact that the Poole–Frenkel effect is described by an expression for the conductivity (and for the current) that diverges with increasing fields and does not experience a saturation, is attributable to the simplifying assumption that the trap population follows the Maxwell-Boltzmann statistics. An enhanced Poole–Frenkel model, comprehensive of a more accurate description of the trap statistics with the Fermi-Dirac formula, and capable to quantitatively represent the saturation, has been devised by Ongaro and Pillonnet.

== Poole–Frenkel transport in electronic memory devices ==
In charge trap flash memories, charge is stored in a trapping material, typically a silicon-nitride layer, as current flows through a dielectric. In the programming process, electrons are emitted from the substrate towards the trapping layer due to a large positive bias applied to the gate. The current transport is the result of two different conduction mechanisms, to be considered in series: the current through the oxide is by tunneling, the conduction mechanism through the nitride is a Poole–Frenkel transport. The tunneling current is described by a modified Fowler-Nordheim tunneling equation, i.e. a tunneling equation that takes into account that the shape of the tunneling barrier is not triangular (as assumed for the Fowler-Nordheim formula derivation), but composed of the series of a trapezoidal barrier in the oxide, and a triangular barrier in the nitride. The Poole–Frenkel process is the limiting mechanism of conduction at the beginning of the memory programming regime due to the higher current provided by tunneling. As the trapped electron charge raises, beginning to screen the field, the modified Fowler-Nordheim tunneling becomes the limiting process. The trapped charge density at the oxide-nitride interface is proportional to the integral of the Poole–Frenkel current flowed across it. With an increasing number of memory write and erase cycles, retention characteristics worsen due to the increasing bulk conductivity in the nitride.

== See also ==
- Schottky effect
- Charge trap flash
- Electrical breakdown
- Dielectrics
