= Domain wall =

Topological soliton

A domain wall is a type of topological soliton that can occur whenever a discrete symmetry is spontaneously broken. It separates neighboring regions (domains), in which a physical field or order parameter has settled into different states. Domain walls are also sometimes called kinks in analogy with closely related kink solution of the sine-Gordon model or models with polynomial potentials. Unstable domain walls can also appear if spontaneously broken discrete symmetry is approximate and there is a false vacuum.

Their formation depends on initial conditions and dynamics of a symmetry-breaking phase transition. Unstable domain walls can also occur if the discrete symmetry broken and there is a false vacuum.

A domain (hyper volume) is extended in three spatial dimensions and one time dimension. A domain wall is the boundary between two neighboring domains. Thus a domain wall is extended in two spatial dimensions and one time dimension.

Important examples are:

- Domain wall (magnetism), an interface separating magnetic domains
- Kink (materials science), a type of dislocation in a crystal
- Domain wall (optics), for domain walls in optics
- Domain wall (string theory), a theoretical 2-dimensional singularity
- Instanton, can form kink or domain walls in Euclidean time.

Besides these important cases similar solitons appear in wide spectrum of the models. Here are other examples:

- Early in the universe, spontaneous breaking of discrete symmetries produced domain walls. The resulting network of domain walls influenced the late stages of cosmological inflation and the cosmic microwave background radiation. Observations constrain the existence of stable domain walls. Models beyond the Standard Model can account for those constraints. Unstable cosmic domain walls may decay and produce observable radiation.
- There exist a class of the braneworld models where the brane is assumed to be a domain wall formed by interacting extra-dimensional fields. The matter is localized due to the interaction with this configuration and can leave it at sufficiently high energies. The jargon term for this domain wall is "thick brane" in contrast to the "thin brane" of the models where it is described as delta-potential or simply as some ideal surface with matter fields on it.
