= Yakov Frenkel =

Soviet physicist (1894–1952)

Yakov Il'ich Frenkel
- Яков Ильич Френкель
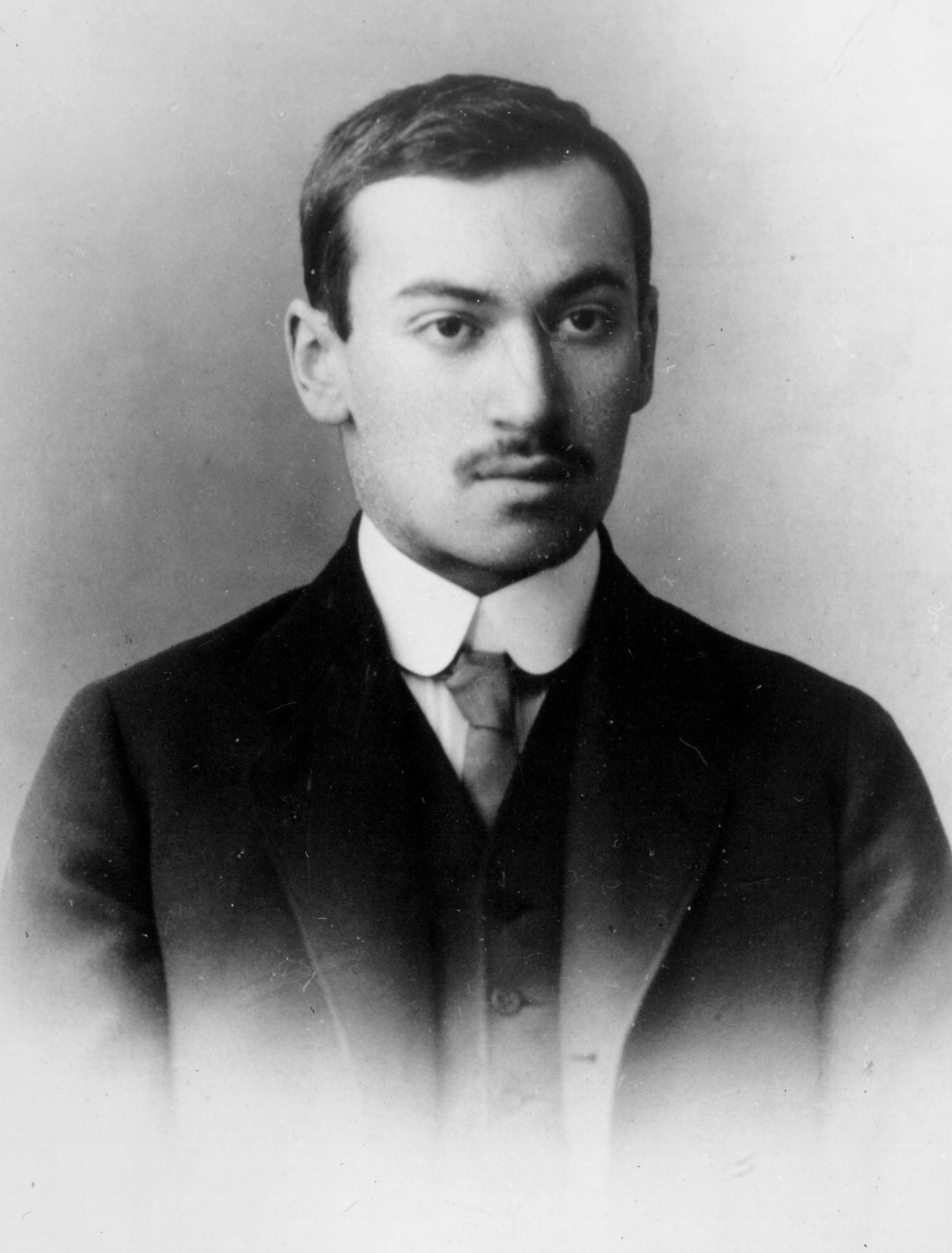
- Born: 10 February 1894; Rostov on Don, Russian Empire
- Died: 23 January 1952 (aged 57); Leningrad, Russian SFSR, Soviet Union
- Education: Saint Petersburg State University
- Known for: Frenkel defect Frenkel exciton Frenkel line Frenkel–Kontorova model Poole–Frenkel effect
- Awards: Stalin prize (1947); Order of the Red Banner of Labour (1945)
- Scientific career
- Fields: Physics; Condensed-matter physics
- Workplaces: Tavrida National V.I. Vernadsky University
- Academic advisors: Abram Ioffe

Yakov Il'ich Frenkel (Russian: Яков Ильич Френкель; 10 February 1894 – 23 January 1952) was a Soviet physicist renowned for his works in the field of condensed-matter physics. He is also known as Jacob Frenkel, frequently using the name J. Frenkel in publications in English.

== Early years ==
He was born to a Jewish family in Rostov on Don, in the Don Host Oblast of the Russian Empire on 10 February 1894. His father was involved in revolutionary activities and spent some time in internal exile to Siberia; after the danger of pogroms started looming in 1905, the family spent some time in Switzerland, where Yakov Frenkel began his education. In 1912, while studying in the Karl May Gymnasium in St. Petersburg, he completed his first physics work on the Earth's magnetic field and atmospheric electricity. This work attracted Abram Ioffe's attention and later led to collaboration with him. He considered moving to the USA (which he visited in the summer of 1913, supported by money hard-earned by tutoring) but was nevertheless admitted to St. Petersburg University in the winter semester of 1913, at which point any emigration plans ended. Frenkel graduated from the university in three years and remained there to prepare for a professorship (his oral exam for the master's degree was delayed due to the events of the October revolution). His first scientific paper came to light in 1917.

== Early scientific career ==
In the last years of the Great War and until 1921 Frenkel was involved (along with Igor Tamm) in the foundation of the University in Crimea (his family moved to Crimea due to the deteriorating health of his mother). From 1921 till the end of his life, Frenkel worked at the Physico-Technical Institute. Beginning in 1922, Frenkel published a book virtually every year. In 1924, he published 16 papers (of which 5 were basically German translations of his other publications in Russian), three books, and edited multiple translations. He was the author of the first theoretical course in the Soviet Union. For his distinguished scientific service, he was elected a corresponding member of the USSR Academy of Sciences in 1929.

He married Sara Isakovna Gordin in 1920. They had two sons, Sergei and Viktor (Victor). He served as a visiting professor at the University of Minnesota in the United States for a short period of time around 1930.

Early works of Yakov Frenkel focused on electrodynamics, statistical mechanics and relativity, though he soon switched to the quantum theory. Paul Ehrenfest, whom he met at a conference in Leningrad, encouraged him to go abroad for collaborations which he did in 1925–1926, mainly in Hamburg and Göttingen, and met with Albert Einstein in Berlin. It was during this period when Schrödinger published his groundbeaking papers on wave mechanics; Heisenberg's had appeared shortly before. Frenkel enthusiastically entered the field through discussions (he reportedly discovered what is now called the Klein–Gordon equation simultaneously with Oskar Klein) but his first scientific paper on the matter (considering electrodynamics in metals) was published in 1927.

In 1927–1930, he discovered the reason for the existence of domains in ferromagnetics; worked on the theory of resonance broadening and collision broadening of the spectral lines; developed a theory of electric resistance on the boundary of two metals and of a metal and a semiconductor.

== Celebrated discoveries ==
In conducting research on the molecular theory of the condensed state (1926), he introduced the notion of the hole in a crystal, three years before Paul Dirac introduced his eponymous sea. The Frenkel defect became firmly established in the physics of solids and liquids. In the 1930s, his research was supplemented with works on the theory of plastic deformation. His theory, now known as the Frenkel–Kontorova model, is important in the study of dislocations. Tatyana Kontorova was then a PhD candidate working with Frenkel.

In 1930 to 1931, Frenkel showed that neutral excitation of a crystal by light is possible, with an electron remaining bound to a hole created at a lattice site identified as a quasiparticle, the exciton. Mention should be made of Frenkel's works on the theory of metals, nuclear physics (the liquid drop model of the nucleus, in 1936), and semiconductors.

In 1930, his son Viktor Frenkel was born. Viktor became a prominent historian of science, writing a number of biographies of prominent physicists including an enlarged version of Yakov Ilich Frenkel, published in 1996.

In 1934, Frenkel outlined the formalism for the multi-configuration self-consistent field method, later rediscovered and developed by Douglas Hartree.

He contributed to semiconductor and insulator physics by proposing a theory, which is now commonly known as the Poole–Frenkel effect, in 1938. "Poole" refers to H. H. Poole (Horace Hewitt Poole, 1886–1962), Ireland. Poole reported experimental results on the conduction in insulators and found an empirical relationship between conductivity and electrical field. Frenkel later developed a microscopic model, similar to the Schottky effect, to explain Poole's results more accurately. In this paper published in USA, Frenkel only very briefly mentioned an empirical relationship as Poole's law. Frenkel cited Poole's paper when he wrote a longer article in a Soviet journal.

During the 1930s, Frenkel and Ioffe opposed dangerous tendencies in Soviet physics, tying science to the materialist ideology, with remarkable courage. Soviet physics, as a result of these actions, never descended to the depths biology did. Still, he subsequently had to forgo publishing several papers, fearing that might have unfortunate consequences.

Yakov Frenkel was involved in the studies of the liquid phase, too, since the mid-1930s (he undertook some research in colloids) and during the World War II, when the institute was evacuated to Kazan. The results of his more than twenty years of study of the theory of liquid state were generalized in the classic monograph "Kinetic theory of liquids".

== Later years ==
During the wartime, he worked on contemporary practical problems to help his country in sustaining the harsh fight. After the war, Frenkel focussed on seismoelectrics, also proposing that sound waves in metals might affect electric phenomena. He subsequently worked mainly in the field of atmospheric effects, but did not abandon his other interests, publishing several papers in nuclear physics.

Frenkel died in Leningrad in 1952. His son, Victor Frenkel, wrote a biography of his father, Yakov Ilich Frenkel: His work, life and letters. This book, originally written in Russian, has also been translated and published in English.

== See also ==
- Chandrasekhar limit
- Poromechanics
- Solid state ionics
