= George Kink =

German ice hockey player

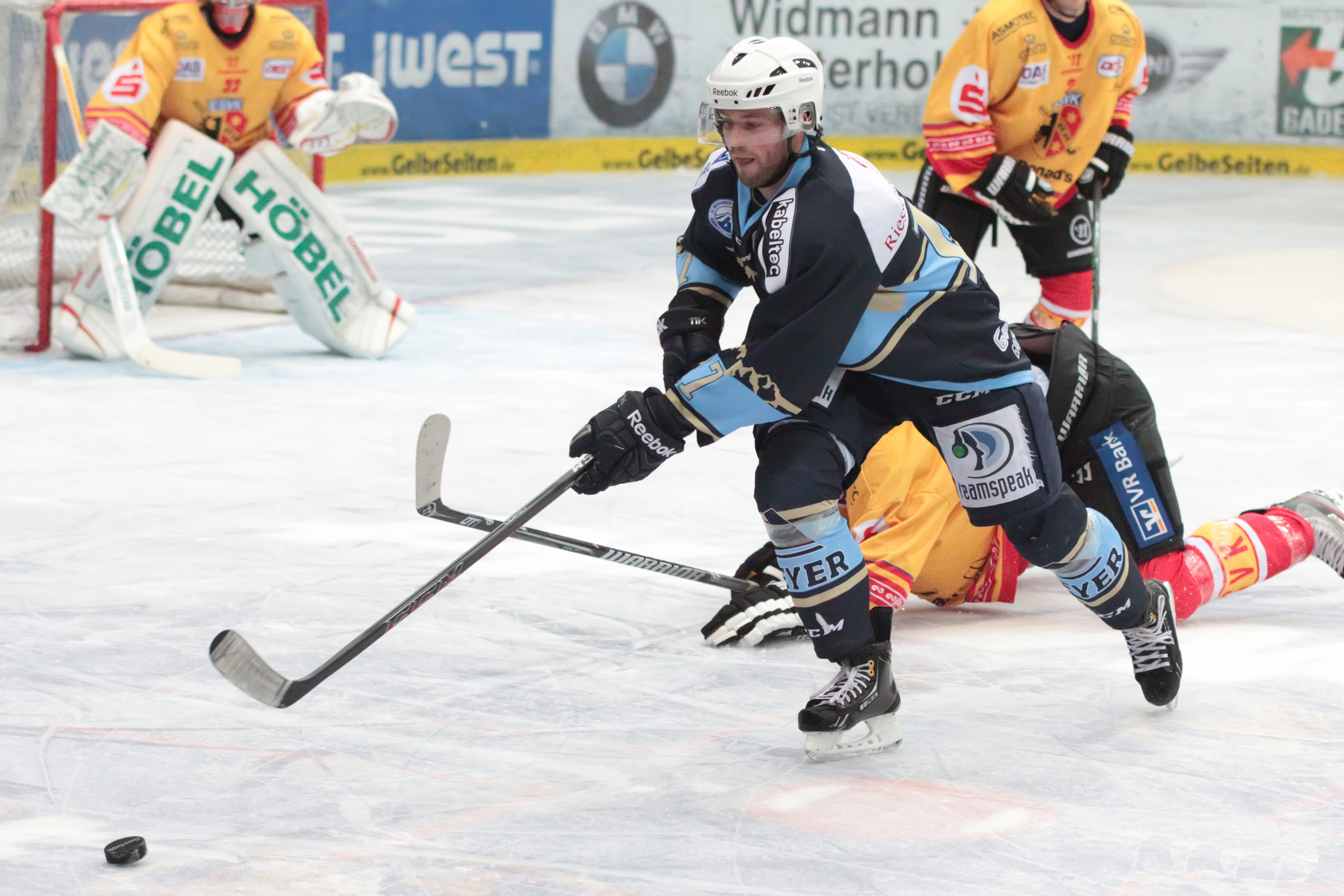
- Born: August 26, 1982 (age 43) Düsseldorf, West Germany
- Height: 5 ft 10 in (178 cm)
- Weight: 172 lb (78 kg; 12 st 4 lb)
- Position: Right wing
- Shot: Left
- Played for: SC Riessersee; EC Peiting; EHC München; EV Füssen; ERC Sonthofen 1999
- NHL draft: Undrafted
- Playing career: 2000–2017

George Kink (born August 26, 1982) is a German former professional ice hockey player. He last played for ERC Sonthofen 1999 in the Oberliga (Germany3). He's the older brother of Marcus Kink and son of Georg Kink.

== Career statistics ==
			Regular season					Playoffs
Season	Team	League	GP	G	A	Pts	PIM	GP	G	A	Pts	PIM
2000–01	SC Riessersee	Germany2	3	0	0	0	0	—	—	—	—	—
2001–02	SC Riessersee	Germany2	62	6	10	16	36	—	—	—	—	—
2002–03	EC Peiting	Germany3	50	13	29	42	97	6	2	1	3	6
2003–04	EC Peiting	Germany3	53	18	13	31	74	—	—	—	—	—
2004–05	EHC München	Germany3	26	9	9	18	14	8	1	1	2	2
2005–06	EHC München	Germany2	50	1	6	7	90	—	—	—	—	—
2006–07	SC Riessersee	Germany3	48	11	27	38	54	9	2	2	4	2
2007–08	SC Riessersee	Germany2	52	8	9	17	12	7	0	1	1	0
2008–09	SC Riessersee	Germany2	46	7	7	14	28	6	1	0	1	2
2009–10	SC Riessersee	Germany2	52	6	12	18	36	1	0	0	0	25
2010–11	SC Riessersee	Germany3	38	23	35	58	24	14	5	12	17	8
2011–12	EHC München	DEL	52	1	1	2	4	—	—	—	—	—
2012–13	EC Peiting	Germany3	20	6	10	16	12	—	—	—	—	—
2013–14	SC Riessersee	DEL2	54	4	2	6	12	5	0	0	0	2
2014–15	EV Füssen	Germany3	32	15	26	41	10	—	—	—	—	—
2015–16	ERC Sonthofen 1999	Germany3	39	19	28	47	20	3	1	2	3	2
2016–17	ERC Sonthofen 1999	Germany3	43	12	24	36	20	12	1	11	12	2
DEL totals			52	1	1	2	4	—	—	—	—	—
Germany2 totals			265	28	44	72	202	14	1	1	2	27
Germany3 totals			349	126	201	327	325	52	12	29	41	22
