= Kinky Island =

Island in Alaska, United States

- Location within Alaska

Geography
- Location: Pacific Ocean
- Coordinates: 57°47′25″N 136°19′48″W
- Archipelago: Alexander Archipelago
- Length: 0.3 mi (0.5 km)
- Highest elevation: 0 ft (0 m)

Administration
- United States
- State: Alaska

Kinky Island is an island in the Alexander Archipelago of the Alaska Panhandle.

Kinky Island was named in 1925 by the United States Coast and Geodetic Survey.

The island is located within Fleming Channel, 12 mi (19 km) west of Chichagof Island, and is within the Tongass National Forest. Kinky Island is included in the Sitka Coastal Management Plan as a special management area and designated recreational use area.
