= Georg Kink =

German ice hockey player (born 1949)

Personal information
- Nationality: German
- Born: 26 August 1949 (age 76) Garmisch-Partenkirchen, West Germany

Sport
- Sport: Ice hockey

Georg Kink (born 26 August 1949) is a German ice hockey player. He competed in the men's tournament at the 1972 Winter Olympics.
