= WNKX =

WNKX may refer to:

- WNKX-FM, a radio station (96.7 FM) licensed to Centerville, Tennessee, United States
- WMAK, a radio station (1570 AM) licensed to Centerville, Tennessee, USA; which held the call sign WNKX from 1991 to 2013

== See also ==
- KNKX (88.5 FM), Tacoma, Washington, USA
- WNLV (95.1 FM), formerly WNKS, Charlotte, North Carolina, USA
- Winx (disambiguation)
- Wink (disambiguation), including Winks
