= J. Thomas Dickinson =

American physicist and astronomer

J. Thomas Dickinson is an American physicist and astronomer.

H earned a B.A. degree in physics from Western Michigan University in 1963, and a PhD degree in chemical physics from the University of Michigan in 1968. He went directly to Washington State University and was appointed Paul A. Anderson Professor and regents professor, positions he held until his retirement in 2017. His field research involved laser-materials relations, nanotribology and tribochemistry.

He is a Fellow of the American Association for the Advancement of Science, American Vacuum Society and American Physical Society.

== Education ==
He graduated from Western Reserve University with a B.A. in physics in 1963 and followed with a PhD in chemical physics from University of Michigan in 1968.
