= Domain wall (optics) =

Topological structure in optics

A domain wall is a term used in physics which can have similar meanings in optics, magnetism, or string theory. These phenomena can all be generically described as topological solitons which occur whenever a discrete symmetry is spontaneously broken.

As of 2009, a phase-locked dark-dark vector soliton was observed only in fiber lasers of positive dispersion while a phase-locked dark-bright vector soliton was obtained in fiber lasers of either positive or negative dispersion. Numerical simulations confirmed the experimental observations, and further showed that the observed vector solitons are the two types of phase-locked polarization domain-wall solitons theoretically predicted. Another novel type of domain wall soliton is the vector dark domain wall, consisting of stable localized structures separating the two orthogonal linear polarization eigenstates of the laser emission, with a dark structure that is visible only when the total laser emission is measured.

== See also ==
- Topological defect
