= Kansai Airlines =

Kansai Airlines was a Japanese domestic airline. It was headquartered in Kyōbashi, Higashi-ku, Osaka, Osaka Prefecture. In 1963 it had one Cessna 185, one Cessna 180, one Cessna 175, one Cessna 172, and two Cessna 170s.
