= Wink (surname) =

Wink or Winks is an English surname. Notable people with the surname include:

- Chris Wink, co-founder of Blue Man Group
- Harry Winks (born 1996), English footballer for Leicester City
- Jack Wink, American college football player and coach
- Josh Wink (born Joshua Winkelman, 1970), American DJ and musician
- Katharine Winks (born 1978), English cricketer
- Robin Winks (1930–2003), American academic, historian, diplomat and writer
- Steven Wink (born 1984), German politician
- Walter Wink (1935-2012), American theologian and political theorist
