= Kink (materials science) =

Interface between crystal structures

Kinks are deviations of a dislocation defect along its glide plane. In edge dislocations, the constant glide plane allows short regions of the dislocation to turn, converting into screw dislocations and producing kinks. Screw dislocations have rotatable glide planes, thus kinks that are generated along screw dislocations act as an anchor for the glide plane. Kinks differ from jogs in that kinks are strictly parallel to the glide plane, while jogs shift away from the glide plane.

== Energy ==
Pure-edge and screw dislocations are conceptually straight in order to minimize its length, and through it, the strain energy of the system. Low-angle mixed dislocations, on the other hand, can be thought of as primarily edge dislocation with screw kinks in a stair-case structure (or vice versa), switching between straight pure-edge and pure-screw dislocation segments. In reality, kinks are not sharp transitions. Both the total length of the dislocation and the kink angle are dependent on the free energy of the system. The primary dislocation regions lie in Peierls-Nabarro potential minima, while the kink requires addition energy in the form of an energy peak. To minimize free energy, the kink equilibrates at a certain length and angle. Large energy peaks create short but sharp kinks in order to minimize dislocation length within the high energy region, while small energy peaks create long and drawn-out kinks in order to minimize total dislocation length.

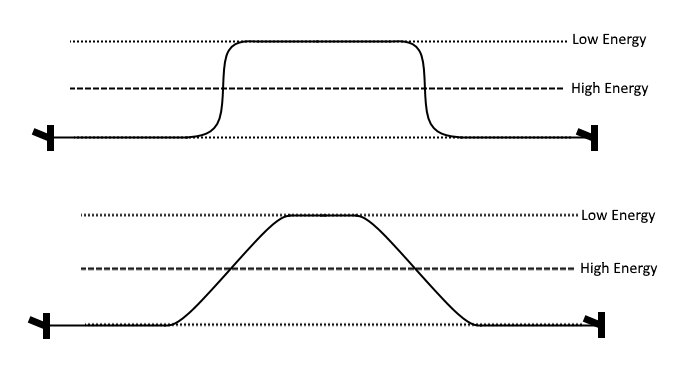
The shape of the kink changes depending on the energy peak. On the top, a large energy peak creates a sharp kink transition. On the bottom, a smaller energy peak creates a wider and more gradual transition.

== Kink movement ==
Kinks facilitate the movement of dislocations along its glide plane under shear stress, and is directly responsible for plastic deformation of crystals. When a crystal undergoes shear force, e.g. cut with scissors, the applied shear force causes dislocations to move through the material, displacing atoms and deforming the material. The entire dislocation does not move at once – rather, the dislocation produces a pair of kinks, which then propagates in opposite directions down the length of the dislocation, eventually shifting the entire dislocation by a Burgers vector. The velocity of dislocations through kink propagation also clearly limited on the nucleation frequency of kinks, as a lack of kinks compromises the mechanism by which dislocations move.

As shear force approaches infinity, the velocity at which dislocations migrate is limited by the physical properties of the material, maximizing at the material's sound velocity. At lower shear stresses, the velocity of dislocations end up relating exponentially with the applied shear force:

$$v_0 = C \tau^p, \,\!$$

where

$\tau$ is applied shear force
$C$ and $p$ are experimentally found constants

The above equation gives the upper limit on dislocation velocity. The interactions of dislocation movement on its environment, particularly other defects such as jogs and precipitates, results in drag and slows down the dislocation:

$$v_D = v_0 e^{-D/\tau}, \,\!$$

where

$D$ is the drag parameter of the crystal

Kink movement is strongly dependent on temperature as well. Higher thermal energy assists in the generation of kinks, as well as increasing atomic vibrations and promoting dislocation motion.

Kinks may also form under compressive stress due to the buckling of crystal planes into a cavity. At high compressive forces, masses of dislocations move at once. Kinks align with each other, forming walls of kinks that propagate all at once. At sufficient forces, the tensile force produced by the dislocation core exceeds the fracture stress of the material, combining kink boundaries into sharp kinks and de-laminating the basal planes of the crystal.

== See also ==
- Terrace ledge kink model
