= Schottky effect =

Phenomenon in condensed matter physics

As an electron leaves the metal (left) towards vacuum (right), its potential energy is not the red static potential, but rather the blue curved potential due to its own image charge.

The Schottky effect or field enhanced thermionic emission is a phenomenon in condensed matter physics named after Walter H. Schottky. In electron emission devices, especially electron guns, the thermionic electron emitter will be biased negative relative to its surroundings. This creates an electric field of magnitude F at the emitter surface. Without the field, the surface barrier seen by an escaping Fermi-level electron has height W equal to the local work-function. The electric field lowers the surface barrier by an amount ΔW, and increases the emission current. It can be modeled by a simple modification of the Richardson equation, by replacing W by (W − ΔW). This gives the equation

$$J (F,T,W) = A_{\mathrm{G}} T^2 e^{ - (W - \Delta W) \over k T}$$
$$\Delta W = \sqrt{q_e^3 F \over 4\pi \epsilon_0},$$

where J is the emission current density, T is the temperature of the metal, W is the work function of the metal, k is the Boltzmann constant, q_{e} is the Elementary charge, ε_{0} is the vacuum permittivity, and A_{G} is the product of a universal constant A_{0} multiplied by a material-specific correction factor λ_{R} which is typically of order 0.5. The expression is sometimes written as $[q_e F/(4\pi\epsilon_0)]^{1/2}$, in which case $\Delta W$ is expressed as a voltage.

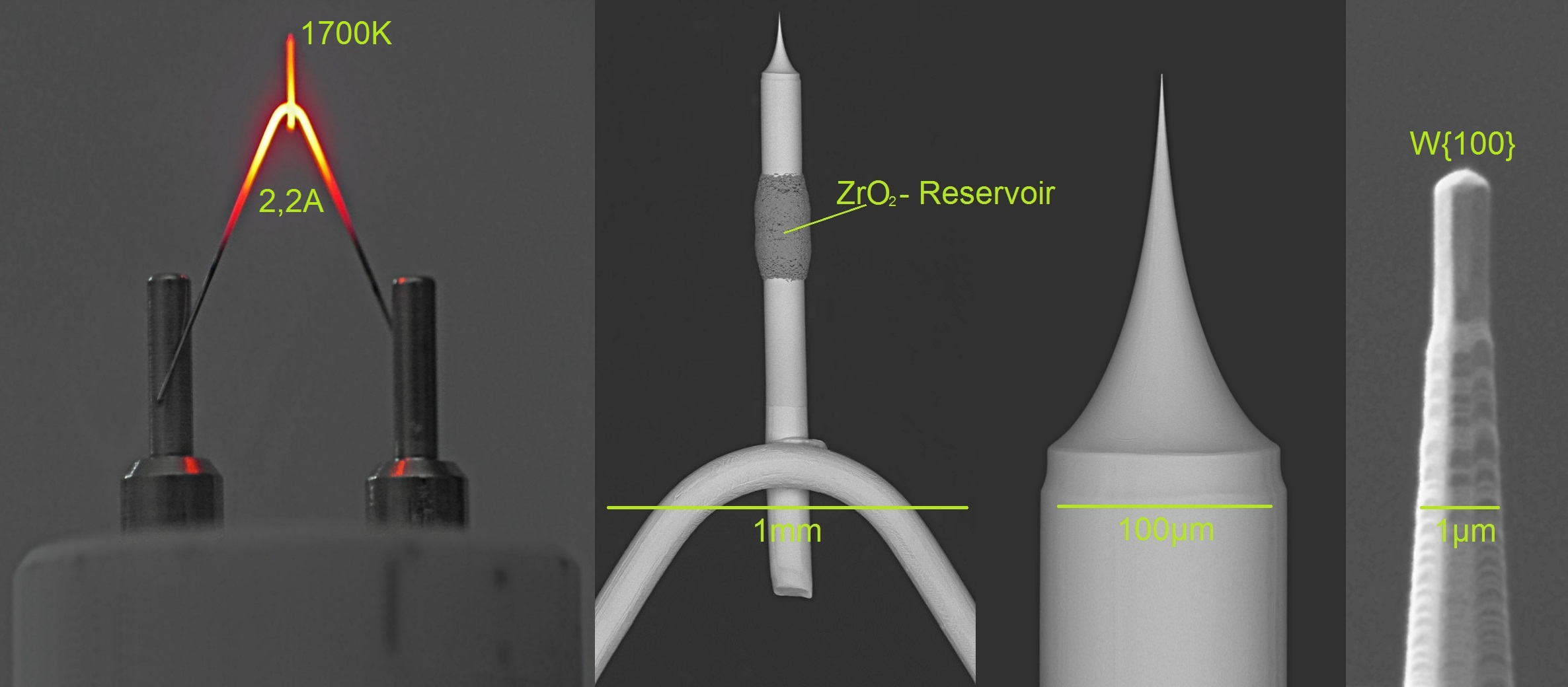
Schottky-emitter electron source of an Electron microscope

Electron emission that takes place in the field-and-temperature-regime where this modified equation applies is often called Schottky emission. This equation is relatively accurate for electric field strengths lower than about 10^{8} V m^{−1}. For electric field strengths higher than 10^{8} V m^{−1}, so-called Fowler–Nordheim (FN) tunneling begins to contribute significant emission current. In this regime, the combined effects of field-enhanced thermionic and field emission can be modeled by the Murphy–Good equation for thermo-field (T-F) emission. At even higher fields, FN tunneling becomes the dominant electron emission mechanism, and the emitter operates in the so-called "cold field electron emission (CFE)" regime.

Thermionic emission can also be enhanced by interaction with other forms of excitation such as light. For example, excited Cs-vapours in thermionic converters form clusters of Cs-Rydberg matter which yield a decrease of collector emitting work function from 1.5 eV to 1.0–0.7 eV. Due to long-lived nature of Rydberg matter this low work function remains low which essentially increases the low-temperature converter’s efficiency.
