= List of scientific units named after people =

This is a list of scientific units named after people. For other lists of eponyms (names derived from people) see eponym. By convention, the name of the unit is properly written starting with a lowercase letter (except where any word would be capitalized), but the first letter of its symbol is a capital letter if it is derived from a proper name.

== SI units ==
- ampere (A), electric current – André-Marie Ampère
- becquerel (Bq), radioactivity – Henri Becquerel
- degree Celsius (°C), temperature – Anders Celsius
- coulomb (C), electric charge – Charles-Augustin de Coulomb
- farad (F), capacitance – Michael Faraday
- gray (Gy), absorbed dose of radiation – Louis Harold Gray
- henry (H), inductance – Joseph Henry
- hertz (Hz), frequency – Heinrich Rudolf Hertz
- joule (J), energy, work, heat – James Prescott Joule
- kelvin (K), thermodynamic temperature – Lord Kelvin
- newton (N), force – Isaac Newton
- ohm (Ω), electrical resistance – Georg Ohm
- pascal (Pa), pressure – Blaise Pascal
- siemens (S), electrical conductance – Werner von Siemens
- sievert (Sv), radiation dose equivalent – Rolf Sievert
- tesla (T), magnetic flux density – Nikola Tesla
- volt (V), electric potential, electromotive force – Alessandro Volta
- watt (W), power, radiant flux – James Watt
- weber (Wb), magnetic flux – Wilhelm Eduard Weber

== CGS units ==
- biot (Bi), electric current – Jean-Baptiste Biot
- buckingham (B), electric quadrupole moment – A. David Buckingham
- debye (D), electric dipole moment – Peter Debye
- eotvos (E), gravitational gradient – Loránd Eötvös
- galileo (Gal), acceleration – Galileo Galilei
- gauss (G or Gs), magnetic flux density – Carl Friedrich Gauss
- gilbert (Gb), magnetomotive force – William Gilbert
- goeppert-mayer (GM), two-photon absorption cross section – Maria Goeppert Mayer
- kayser (kayser), wavenumber – Heinrich Kayser
- maxwell (Mx), magnetic flux – James Clerk Maxwell
- oersted (Oe), magnetic field strength – Hans Christian Ørsted
- poise (P), dynamic viscosity – Jean Léonard Marie Poiseuille
- Rayl or Rayleigh (Rayl), acoustic impedance – John William Strutt, 3rd Baron Rayleigh
- rayleigh (R), photon flux – Robert Strutt, 4th Baron Rayleigh
- stokes (S or St), kinematic viscosity – George Gabriel Stokes

=== No longer in use ===
- franklin (Fr), electric charge – Benjamin Franklin
- clausius (Cl), entropy – Rudolf Clausius

== Others ==
- angstrom (Å), distance – Anders Jonas Ångström
- baud (Bd), symbol rate – Émile Baudot
- Bark scale, psychoacoustical scale – Heinrich Barkhausen
- brewster (B), stress optic coefficient – David Brewster
- centimorgan (cM), recombination frequency – Thomas Hunt Morgan
- curie (Ci), radioactivity – Marie and Pierre Curie
- dalton (Da), atomic mass – John Dalton
- darcy (D), permeability, – Henry Darcy
- decibel (dB) dimensionless proportions and ratios, e.g. relative power levels – Alexander Graham Bell
- degree Fahrenheit (°F), temperature – Daniel Gabriel Fahrenheit
- degree Rankine (°R), temperature – William John Macquorn Rankine
- Dobson unit (DU), atmospheric ozone – Gordon Dobson
- erlang (E), dimensionless volume of telecommunications traffic – Agner Krarup Erlang
- fermi (fm), distance – Enrico Fermi
- hartley (Hart), information – Ralph Hartley
- hartree (Ha), energy – Douglas Hartree
- Hounsfield scale, radiodensity – Godfrey Newbold Hounsfield
- jansky (Jy), electromagnetic flux – Karl Jansky
- langley (ly), solar radiation – Samuel Pierpont Langley
- langmuir (L), gas exposure dose – Irving Langmuir
- neper (Np), relative power level – John Napier
- degree Öchsle (°Oe), density – Ferdinand Öchsle
- Rockwell scale (HR), indentation hardness – Stanley Rockwell
- röntgen (R), dosage of X-rays or gamma radiation – Wilhelm Röntgen
- Richter magnitude, earthquake power – Charles Francis Richter
- Scoville units, capsaicin content of chili peppers – Wilbur Scoville
- shannon (Sh), information – Claude Shannon
- siegbahn (xu), distance – Manne Siegbahn
- svedberg (S or Sv), sedimentation rate – Theodor Svedberg
- sverdrup (Sv), volume transport rate – Harald Sverdrup
- torr (Torr), pressure – Evangelista Torricelli
- troland (Td), luminance (human eye) – Leonard Troland

=== Natural unit systems ===
- Planck units – Max Planck
- Stoney units – George Stoney

=== No longer in use ===
- Mercalli intensity scale, earthquake effects – Giuseppe Mercalli
- degree Réaumur (°R), temperature – René Antoine Ferchault de Réaumur
- degree Delisle (°D), temperature – Joseph-Nicolas Delisle
- degree Newton (°N), temperature – Isaac Newton
- degree Rømer (°Rø), temperature – Ole Rømer
- degree Baumé (°Bé), density – Antoine Baumé
- einstein (E), photochemistry – Albert Einstein
- poncelet (p), power – Jean-Victor Poncelet
- faraday (Fd), electrical charge – Michael Faraday

== See also ==
- List of eponyms
- Lists of etymologies
- List of obsolete units of measurement
- List of unusual units of measurement
- List of humorous units of measurement
- List of scientists whose names are used as SI units
- List of scientists whose names are used as non SI units
