= Degree (temperature) =

Term used in defining several scales of temperature

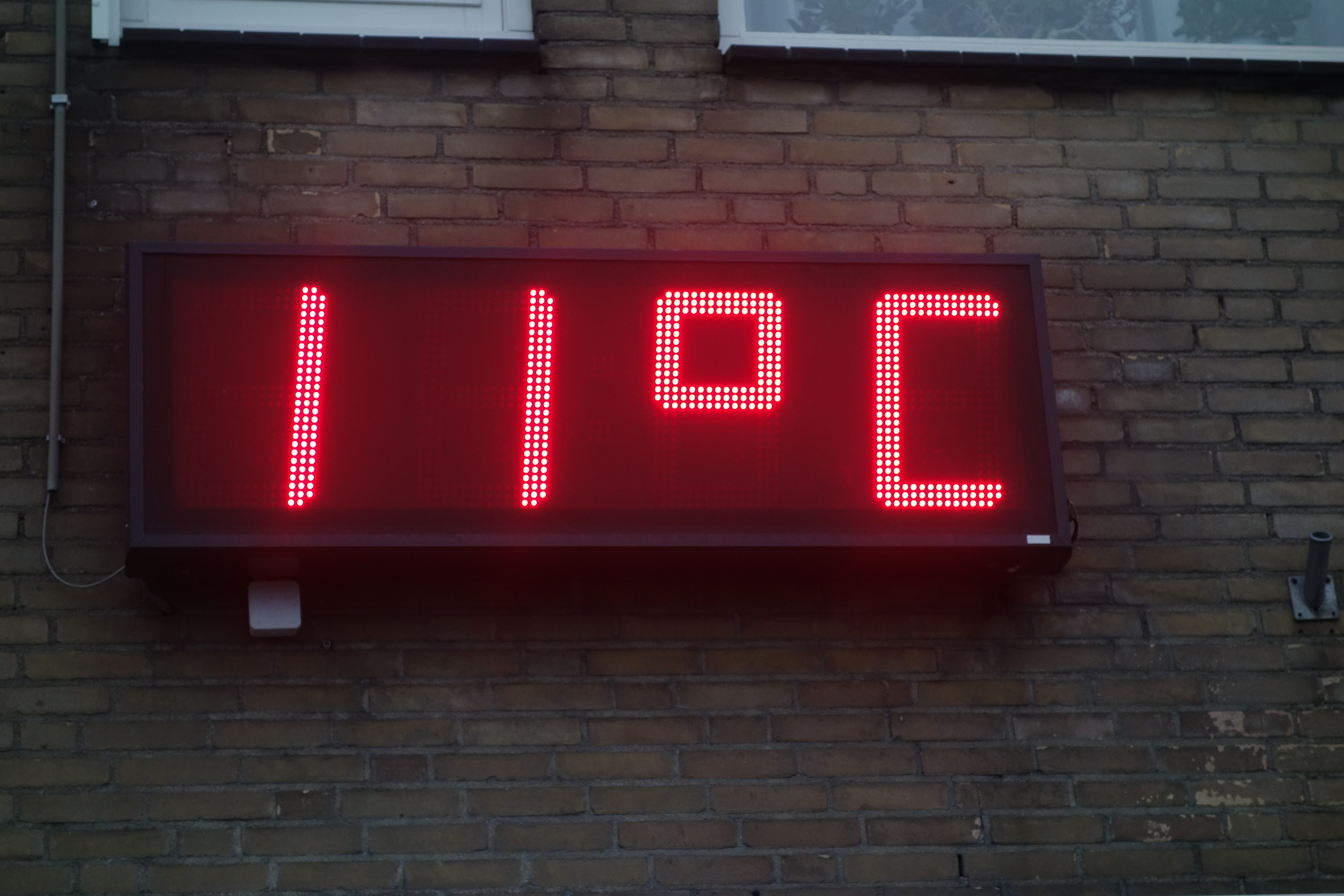
Temperature of 11°Celsius displayed on a digital clock

The term degree is used in several scales of temperature, with the notable exception of kelvin, primary unit of temperature for engineering and the physical sciences. The degree symbol ° is usually used, followed by the initial letter of the unit; for example, "°C" for degree Celsius. A degree can be defined as a set change in temperature measured against a given scale; for example, one degree Celsius is one-hundredth of the temperature change between the point at which water starts to change state from solid to liquid state and the point at which it starts to change from its liquid to gaseous state.

== Scales of temperature measured in degrees ==
Common scales of temperature measured in degrees:

- Celsius (°C)
- Fahrenheit (°F)
- Rankine (°R or °Ra), which uses the Fahrenheit scale, adjusted so that 0 degrees Rankine is equal to absolute zero.

Unlike the degree Fahrenheit and degree Celsius, the kelvin is no longer referred to or written as a degree (but was before 1967). The kelvin is the primary unit of temperature measurement in the physical sciences, but is often used in conjunction with the degree Celsius, which has the same magnitude.

Other scales of temperature:

- Delisle (°D)
- Newton (°N)
- Réaumur (°Ré)
- Rømer (°Rø)
- Wedgwood (°W)

== Kelvin ==
The "degree Kelvin" (°K) is a former name and symbol for the SI unit of temperature on the thermodynamic (absolute) temperature scale. Since 1967, it has been known simply as the kelvin, with symbol K (without a degree symbol). Degree absolute (°A) is obsolete terminology, often referring specifically to the kelvin but sometimes the degree Rankine as well.

== Comparisons ==
- Boiling point of water: 100.0 °C / 212.0 °F
- Melting point of ice: 0.0 °C / 32.0 °F
- Typical human body temperature: 37.0 °C / 98.6 °F
- Room temperature: 20–25 °C / 68–77 °F

== Temperature conversions ==
All three of the major temperature scales are related through a linear equation, and so the conversion between any of them is relatively straightforward. For instance, any Celsius temperature c °C can be calculated from a corresponding Fahrenheit temperature f °F or absolute temperature k K.

$$\begin{align}
c \;=\; \frac{5}{9}(f - 32) \;=\; k-273.15
\end{align}$$

The equations above may also be rearranged to solve for $f$ or $k$, to give

$$\begin{align}
f \;&=\; \frac{9}{5}c + 32 \;=\; \frac{9}{5} (k-273.15) + 32\\
k \;&=\; c+273.15 \;=\; \frac{5}{9}(f - 32) + 273.15
\end{align}$$

== See also ==
- Comparison of temperature scales
- International System of Units
