= Absolute temperature scale =

Absolute temperature scale may refer to

- Kelvin scale, an absolute-temperature scale related to the Celsius scale
- Rankine scale, an absolute-temperature scale related to the Fahrenheit scale

== See also ==
- Thermodynamic temperature, or absolute temperature, a physical quantity which measures temperature starting from absolute zero
- Absolute scale
