= Scale of temperature =

Method to measure temperature quantitatively

Equivalent temperatures in the Kelvin (K), Celsius (°C), and Fahrenheit (°F) scales

Scale of temperature or temperature scale is a methodology of calibrating the physical quantity temperature in metrology. Empirical scales measure temperature in relation to convenient and stable parameters or reference points, such as the freezing and boiling point of water. Absolute temperature is based on thermodynamic principles: using the lowest possible temperature as the zero point, and selecting a convenient incremental unit.

Celsius, Kelvin, and Fahrenheit are common temperature scales. Other scales used throughout history include Rankine, Rømer, Newton, Delisle, Réaumur, Gas mark, Leiden, and Wedgwood.

== Technical definition ==
The zeroth law of thermodynamics describes thermal equilibrium between thermodynamic systems in form of an equivalence relation. Accordingly, the set of all thermal systems may be divided into a quotient set of equivalence classes, denoted as $M$, where any element of $M$ collects all systems that are in thermal equilibrium with one another.

If the set $M$ has cardinality at most $\mathfrak{c}$ (the cardinality of the continuum), then one can construct an injective function $f \colon M \to \mathbb{R}$ into the real numbers by which every thermal system has a parameter – a specific real number – associated with it: the property of temperature. By definition, when two systems are in thermal equilibrium, they belong to the same equivalence class, hence to the same element of $M$, and are assigned the same temperature. Conversely, two systems not in thermal equilibrium belong to different equivalence classes, and since $f$ is injective, they are assigned different temperatures.

Temperature depends on the specific choice of $f$, and any suitable $f$ – any specific way of assigning numerical values for temperature – establishes a scale of temperature. In practical terms, a temperature scale is always based on usually a single physical property of a simple thermodynamic system, called a thermometer, that defines a scaling function for mapping the temperature to the measurable thermometric parameter. Such temperature scales that are purely based on measurement are called empirical temperature scales.

The second law of thermodynamics provides a fundamental, natural definition of thermodynamic temperature starting with a null point of absolute zero. A scale for thermodynamic temperature is established similarly to the empirical temperature scales, however, needing only one additional fixing point.

== Empirical scales ==
Empirical scales are based on the measurement of physical parameters that express the property of interest to be measured through some formal, most commonly a simple linear, functional relationship. For the measurement of temperature, the formal definition of thermal equilibrium in terms of the thermodynamic coordinate spaces of thermodynamic systems, expressed in the zeroth law of thermodynamics, provides the framework to measure temperature.

All temperature scales, including the modern thermodynamic temperature scale used in the International System of Units, are calibrated according to thermal properties of a particular substance or device. Typically, this is established by fixing two well-defined temperature points and defining temperature increments via a linear function of the response of the thermometric device. For example, both the old Celsius scale and Fahrenheit scale were originally based on the linear expansion of a narrow mercury column within a limited range of temperature, each using different reference points and scale increments.

Different empirical scales may not be compatible with each other, except for small regions of temperature overlap. If an alcohol thermometer and a mercury thermometer have the same two fixed points, namely the freezing and boiling point of water, their readings will not agree with each other except at the fixed points, as the linear 1:1 relationship of expansion between any two thermometric substances may not be guaranteed.

Empirical temperature scales are not reflective of the fundamental, microscopic laws of matter. Temperature is a universal attribute of matter, yet empirical scales map a narrow range onto a scale that is known to have a useful functional form for a particular application. Thus, their range is limited. The working material only exists in a form under certain circumstances, beyond which it no longer can serve as a scale. For example, mercury freezes below 234.32 K, so temperatures lower than that cannot be measured in a scale based on mercury. Even ITS-90, which interpolates among different ranges of temperature, has a range of only 0.65 K to approximately 1358 K (−272.5 °C to 1085 °C).

=== Ideal gas scale ===
When pressure approaches zero, all real gas will behave like ideal gas, that is, pV of a mole of gas relying only on temperature. Therefore, we can design a scale with pV as its argument. Of course any bijective function will do, but for convenience's sake a linear function is the best. Therefore, we define it as

$$T={1 \over nR}\lim_{p \to 0}{pV}.$$

The ideal gas scale is in some sense a "mixed" scale. It relies on the universal properties of gas, a big advance from just a particular substance. But still it is empirical since it puts gas at a special position and thus has limited applicability—at some point no gas can exist. One distinguishing characteristic of ideal gas scale, however, is that it precisely equals thermodynamical scale when it is well defined (see § Equality to ideal gas scale).

=== International temperature scale of 1990 ===
ITS-90 is designed to represent the thermodynamic temperature scale (referencing absolute zero) as closely as possible throughout its range. Many different thermometer designs are required to cover the entire range. These include helium vapor pressure thermometers, helium gas thermometers, standard platinum resistance thermometers (known as SPRTs, PRTs or Platinum RTDs) and monochromatic radiation thermometers.

Although the Kelvin and Celsius scales are defined using absolute zero (0 K) and the triple point of water (273.16 K and 0.01 °C), it is impractical to use this definition at temperatures that are very different from the triple point of water. Accordingly, ITS–90 uses numerous defined points, all of which are based on various thermodynamic equilibrium states of fourteen pure chemical elements and one compound (water). Most of the defined points are based on a phase transition; specifically the melting/freezing point of a pure chemical element. However, the deepest cryogenic points are based exclusively on the vapor pressure/temperature relationship of helium and its isotopes whereas the remainder of its cold points (those less than room temperature) are based on triple points. Examples of other defining points are the triple point of hydrogen (−259.3467 °C) and the freezing point of aluminum (660.323 °C).

Thermometers calibrated per ITS–90 use complex mathematical formulas to interpolate between its defined points. ITS–90 specifies rigorous control over variables to ensure reproducibility from lab to lab. For instance, the small effect that atmospheric pressure has upon the various melting points is compensated for (an effect that typically amounts to no more than half a millikelvin across the different altitudes and barometric pressures likely to be encountered). The standard even compensates for the pressure effect due to how deeply the temperature probe is immersed into the sample. ITS–90 also draws a distinction between "freezing" and "melting" points. The distinction depends on whether heat is going into (melting) or out of (freezing) the sample when the measurement is made. Only gallium is measured while melting, all the other metals are measured while the samples are freezing.

There are often small differences between measurements calibrated per ITS–90 and thermodynamic temperature. For instance, precise measurements show that the boiling point of VSMOW water under one standard atmosphere of pressure is actually 373.1339 K (99.9839 °C) when adhering strictly to the two-point definition of thermodynamic temperature. When calibrated to ITS–90, where one must interpolate between the defining points of gallium and indium, the boiling point of VSMOW water is about 10 mK less, about 99.974 °C. The virtue of ITS–90 is that another lab in another part of the world will measure the very same temperature with ease due to the advantages of a comprehensive international calibration standard featuring many conveniently spaced, reproducible, defining points spanning a wide range of temperatures.

=== OV ===
OV is a specialized scale used in Japan to measure female basal body temperature for fertility awareness. The range of 35.5 °C (OV 0) to 38.0 °C (OV 50) is divided into 50 equal parts.

== Celsius scale ==
Celsius (known until 1948 as centigrade) is a temperature scale that is named after the Swedish astronomer Anders Celsius (1701–1744), who developed a similar temperature scale two years before his death. The degree Celsius (°C) can refer to a specific temperature on the Celsius scale as well as a unit to indicate a temperature interval (a difference between two temperatures).

From 1744 until 1954, 0 °C was defined as the freezing point of water and 100 °C was defined as the boiling point of water, both at a pressure of one standard atmosphere.

Although these defining correlations are commonly taught in schools today, by international agreement, between 1954 and 2019 the unit degree Celsius and the Celsius scale were defined by absolute zero and the triple point of VSMOW (specially prepared water). This definition also precisely related the Celsius scale to the Kelvin scale, which defines the SI base unit of thermodynamic temperature with symbol K. Absolute zero, the lowest temperature possible, is defined as being exactly 0 K and −273.15 °C. Until 19 May 2019, the temperature of the triple point of water was defined as exactly 273.16 K (0.01 °C). This means that a temperature difference of one degree Celsius and that of one kelvin are exactly the same.

On 20 May 2019, the kelvin was redefined so that its value is now determined by the definition of the Boltzmann constant rather than being defined by the triple point of VSMOW. This means that the triple point is now a measured value, not a defined value. The newly defined exact value of the Boltzmann constant was selected so that the measured value of the VSMOW triple point is exactly the same as the older defined value to within the limits of accuracy of contemporary metrology. The degree Celsius remains exactly equal to the kelvin, and 0 K remains exactly −273.15 °C.

== Thermodynamic scale ==
Thermodynamic scale differs from empirical scales in that it is absolute. It is based on the fundamental laws of thermodynamics or statistical mechanics instead of some arbitrary chosen working material. Besides it covers full range of temperature and has simple relation with microscopic quantities like the average kinetic energy of particles (see equipartition theorem). In experiments ITS-90 is used to approximate thermodynamic scale due to simpler realization.

=== Definition ===
Lord Kelvin devised the thermodynamic scale based on the efficiency of heat engines as shown below:

The efficiency of an engine is the work divided by the heat introduced to the system or

$$\eta = \frac {w_\text{cy}}{q_H} = \frac{q_\text{H}-q_\text{C}}{q_\text{H}} = 1 - \frac{q_\text{C}}{q_\text{H}} \qquad (1),$$

where w_{cy} is the work done per cycle. Thus, the efficiency depends only on q_{C}/q_{H}.

Because of Carnot theorem, any reversible heat engine operating between temperatures T_{1} and T_{2} must have the same efficiency, meaning, the efficiency is the function of the temperatures only:

$$\frac{q_\text{C}}{q_\text{H}} = f(T_\text{H},T_\text{C})\qquad (2).$$

In addition, a reversible heat engine operating between temperatures T_{1} and T_{3} must have the same efficiency as one consisting of two cycles, one between T_{1} and another (intermediate) temperature T_{2}, and the second between T_{2} and T_{3}. This can only be the case if

$$f(T_1,T_3) = \frac{q_3}{q_1} = \frac{q_2 q_3} {q_1 q_2} = f(T_1,T_2)f(T_2,T_3).$$

Specializing to the case that $T_1$ is a fixed reference temperature: the temperature of the triple point of water. Then for any T_{2} and T_{3},

$$f(T_2,T_3) = \frac{f(T_1,T_3)}{f(T_1,T_2)} = \frac{273.16 \cdot f(T_1,T_3)}{273.16 \cdot f(T_1,T_2)}.$$

Therefore, if thermodynamic temperature is defined by

$$T = 273.16 \cdot f(T_1,T) \,$$

then the function f, viewed as a function of thermodynamic temperature, is

$$f(T_2,T_3) = \frac{T_3}{T_2},$$

and the reference temperature T_{1} has the value 273.16. (Of course any reference temperature and any positive numerical value could be used—the choice here corresponds to the Kelvin scale.)

=== Equality to ideal gas scale ===
It follows immediately that

$$\frac{q_\text{C}}{q_\text{H}} = f(T_\text{H},T_\text{C}) = \frac{T_\text{C}}{T_\text{H}}.\qquad (3).$$

Substituting Equation 3 back into Equation 1 gives a relationship for the efficiency in terms of temperature:

$$\eta = 1 - \frac{q_\text{C}}{q_\text{H}} = 1 - \frac{T_\text{C}}{T_\text{H}}\qquad (4).$$

This is identical to the efficiency formula for Carnot cycle, which effectively employs the ideal gas scale. This means that the two scales equal numerically at every point.

== See also ==
- Outline of metrology and measurement
- Conversion of scales of temperature
