= Conversion of scales of temperature =

Comparison of various temperature scales

This is a collection of temperature conversion formulas and comparisons among eight different temperature scales, several of which have long been obsolete.

Temperatures on scales that either do not share a numeric zero or are nonlinearly related cannot correctly be mathematically equated (related using the symbol =), and thus temperatures on different scales are more correctly described as corresponding (related using the symbol ≘).

== Conversion calculator ==
Calculator for temperature conversion
Celsius	Fahrenheit	Kelvin	Rankine	Delisle	Newton	Réaumur	Rømer
0	32	273.15	491.67	150	0	0	7.5

== Celsius scale ==
Temperature conversions
	from Celsius	to Celsius
Kelvin	x °C ≘ (x + 273.15) K	x K ≘ (x − 273.15) °C
Fahrenheit	x °C ≘ (x × 9/5 + 32) °F	x °F ≘ (x − 32) × 5/9 °C
Rankine	x °C ≘ (x + 273.15) × 9/5 °R	x °R ≘ (x − 491.67) × 5/9 °C

== Kelvin scale ==
Temperature conversions
	from Kelvin	to Kelvin
Celsius	x K ≘ (x − 273.15) °C	x °C ≘ (x + 273.15) K
Fahrenheit	x K ≘ (x × 9/5 − 459.67) °F	x °F ≘ (x + 459.67) × 5/9 K
Rankine	x K ≘ x × 9/5 °R	x °R ≘ x × 5/9 K

== Fahrenheit scale ==
Temperature conversions
	from Fahrenheit	to Fahrenheit
Celsius	x °F ≘ (x − 32) × 5/9 °C	x °C ≘ (x × 9/5 + 32) °F
Kelvin	x °F ≘ (x + 459.67) × 5/9 K	x K ≘ (x × 9/5 − 459.67) °F
Rankine	x °F ≘ (x + 459.67) °R	x °R ≘ (x − 459.67) °F

== Rankine scale ==
Temperature conversions
	from Rankine	to Rankine
Celsius	x °R ≘ (x − 491.67) × 5/9 °C	x °C ≘ (x + 273.15) × 9/5 °R
Kelvin	x °R ≘ x × 5/9 K	x K ≘ x × 9/5 °R
Fahrenheit	x °R ≘ (x − 459.67) °F	x °F ≘ (x + 459.67) °R

== Delisle scale ==
Temperature conversions
	from Delisle	to Delisle
Celsius	x °De ≘ (100 − x × 2/3) °C	x °C ≘ (100 − x) × 3/2 °De
Kelvin	x °De ≘ (373.15 − x × 2/3) K	x K ≘ (373.15 − x) × 3/2 °De
Fahrenheit	x °De ≘ (212 − x × 6/5) °F	x °F ≘ (212 − x) × 5/6 °De
Rankine	x °De ≘ (671.67 − x × 6/5) °R	x °R ≘ (671.67 − x) × 5/6 °De

== Newton scale ==
Temperature conversions
	from Newton	to Newton
Celsius	x °N ≘ x × 100/33 °C	x °C ≘ x × 33/100 °N
Kelvin	x °N ≘ (x × 100/33 + 273.15) K	x K ≘ (x − 273.15) × 33/100 °N
Fahrenheit	x °N ≘ (x × 60/11 + 32) °F	x °F ≘ (x − 32) × 11/60 °N
Rankine	x °N ≘ (60/11 x + 491.67) °R	x °R ≘ (x − 491.67) × 11/60 °N

== Réaumur scale ==
Temperature conversions
	from Réaumur	to Réaumur
Celsius	x °Ré ≘ x × 5/4 °C	x °C ≘ x × 4/5 °Ré
Kelvin	x °Ré ≘ (x × 5/4 + 273.15) K	x K ≘ (x − 273.15) × 4/5 °Ré
Fahrenheit	x °Ré ≘ (x × 9/4 + 32) °F	x °F ≘ (x − 32) × 4/9 °Ré
Rankine	x °Ré ≘ (x × 9/4 + 491.67) °R	x °R ≘ (x − 491.67) × 4/9 °Ré

== Rømer scale ==
Temperature conversions
	from Rømer	to Rømer
Celsius	x °Rø ≘ (x − 7.5) × 40/21 °C	x °C ≘ (x × 21/40 + 7.5) °Rø
Kelvin	x °Rø ≘ ((x − 7.5) × 40/21 + 273.15) K	x K ≘ ((x − 273.15) × 21/40 + 7.5) °Rø
Fahrenheit	x °Rø ≘ ((x − 7.5) × 24/7 + 32) °F	x °F ≘ ((x − 32) × 7/24 + 7.5) °Rø
Rankine	x °Rø ≘ ((x − 7.5) × 24/7 + 491.67) °R	x °R ≘ ((x − 491.67) × 7/24 + 7.5) °Rø

== Comparison values chart ==
Celsius	Fahrenheit	Kelvin	Rankine	Delisle	Newton	Réaumur	Rømer
500.00	932.00	773.15	1391.67	−600.00	165.00	400.00	270.00
490.00	914.00	763.15	1373.67	−585.00	161.70	392.00	264.75
480.00	896.00	753.15	1355.67	−570.00	158.40	384.00	259.50
470.00	878.00	743.15	1337.67	−555.00	155.10	376.00	254.25
460.00	860.00	733.15	1319.67	−540.00	151.80	368.00	249.00
450.00	842.00	723.15	1301.67	−525.00	148.50	360.00	243.75
440.00	824.00	713.15	1283.67	−510.00	145.20	352.00	238.50
430.00	806.00	703.15	1265.67	−495.00	141.90	344.00	233.25
420.00	788.00	693.15	1247.67	−480.00	138.60	336.00	228.00
410.00	770.00	683.15	1229.67	−465.00	135.30	328.00	222.75
400.00	752.00	673.15	1211.67	−450.00	132.00	320.00	217.50
390.00	734.00	663.15	1193.67	−435.00	128.70	312.00	212.25
380.00	716.00	653.15	1175.67	−420.00	125.40	304.00	207.00
370.00	698.00	643.15	1157.67	−405.00	122.10	296.00	201.75
360.00	680.00	633.15	1139.67	−390.00	118.80	288.00	196.50
350.00	662.00	623.15	1121.67	−375.00	115.50	280.00	191.25
340.00	644.00	613.15	1103.67	−360.00	112.20	272.00	186.00
330.00	626.00	603.15	1085.67	−345.00	108.90	264.00	180.75
320.00	608.00	593.15	1067.67	−330.00	105.60	256.00	175.50
310.00	590.00	583.15	1049.67	−315.00	102.30	248.00	170.25
300.00	572.00	573.15	1031.67	−300.00	99.00	240.00	165.00
290.00	554.00	563.15	1013.67	−285.00	95.70	232.00	159.75
280.00	536.00	553.15	995.67	−270.00	92.40	224.00	154.50
270.00	518.00	543.15	977.67	−255.00	89.10	216.00	149.25
260.00	500.00	533.15	959.67	−240.00	85.80	208.00	144.00
250.00	482.00	523.15	941.67	−225.00	82.50	200.00	138.75
240.00	464.00	513.15	923.67	−210.00	79.20	192.00	133.50
230.00	446.00	503.15	905.67	−195.00	75.90	184.00	128.25
220.00	428.00	493.15	887.67	−180.00	72.60	176.00	123.00
210.00	410.00	483.15	869.67	−165.00	69.30	168.00	117.75
200.00	392.00	473.15	851.67	−150.00	66.00	160.00	112.50
190.00	374.00	463.15	833.67	−135.00	62.70	152.00	107.25
180.00	356.00	453.15	815.67	−120.00	59.40	144.00	102.00
170.00	338.00	443.15	797.67	−105.00	56.10	136.00	96.75
160.00	320.00	433.15	779.67	−90.00	52.80	128.00	91.50
150.00	302.00	423.15	761.67	−75.00	49.50	120.00	86.25
140.00	284.00	413.15	743.67	−60.00	46.20	112.00	81.00
130.00	266.00	403.15	725.67	−45.00	42.90	104.00	75.75
120.00	248.00	393.15	707.67	−30.00	39.60	96.00	70.50
110.00	230.00	383.15	689.67	−15.00	36.30	88.00	65.25
100.00	212.00	373.15	671.67	0.00	33.00	80.00	60.00
90.00	194.00	363.15	653.67	15.00	29.70	72.00	54.75
80.00	176.00	353.15	635.67	30.00	26.40	64.00	49.50
70.00	158.00	343.15	617.67	45.00	23.10	56.00	44.25
60.00	140.00	333.15	599.67	60.00	19.80	48.00	39.00
50.00	122.00	323.15	581.67	75.00	16.50	40.00	33.75
40.00	104.00	313.15	563.67	90.00	13.20	32.00	28.50
30.00	86.00	303.15	545.67	105.00	9.90	24.00	23.25
20.00	68.00	293.15	527.67	120.00	6.60	16.00	18.00
10.00	50.00	283.15	509.67	135.00	3.30	8.00	12.75
0.00	32.00	273.15	491.67	150.00	0.00	0.00	7.50
−10.00	14.00	263.15	473.67	165.00	−3.30	−8.00	2.25
−14.26	6.29	258.86	465.96	171.43	−4.71	−11.43	0.00
−17.78	0.00	255.37	459.67	176.67	−5.87	−14.22	−1.83
−20.00	−4.00	253.15	455.67	180.00	−6.60	−16.00	−3.00
−30.00	−22.00	243.15	437.67	195.00	−9.90	−24.00	−8.25
−40.00	−40.00	233.15	419.67	210.00	−13.20	−32.00	−13.50
−50.00	−58.00	223.15	401.67	225.00	−16.50	−40.00	−18.75
−60.00	−76.00	213.15	383.67	240.00	−19.80	−48.00	−24.00
−70.00	−94.00	203.15	365.67	255.00	−23.10	−56.00	−29.25
−80.00	−112.00	193.15	347.67	270.00	−26.40	−64.00	−34.50
−90.00	−130.00	183.15	329.67	285.00	−29.70	−72.00	−39.75
−100.00	−148.00	173.15	311.67	300.00	−33.00	−80.00	−45.00
−110.00	−166.00	163.15	293.67	315.00	−36.30	−88.00	−50.25
−120.00	−184.00	153.15	275.67	330.00	−39.60	−96.00	−55.50
−130.00	−202.00	143.15	257.67	345.00	−42.90	−104.00	−60.75
−140.00	−220.00	133.15	239.67	360.00	−46.20	−112.00	−66.00
−150.00	−238.00	123.15	221.67	375.00	−49.50	−120.00	−71.25
−160.00	−256.00	113.15	203.67	390.00	−52.80	−128.00	−76.50
−170.00	−274.00	103.15	185.67	405.00	−56.10	−136.00	−81.75
−180.00	−292.00	93.15	167.67	420.00	−59.40	−144.00	−87.00
−190.00	−310.00	83.15	149.67	435.00	−62.70	−152.00	−92.25
−200.00	−328.00	73.15	131.67	450.00	−66.00	−160.00	−97.50
−210.00	−346.00	63.15	113.67	465.00	−69.30	−168.00	−102.75
−220.00	−364.00	53.15	95.67	480.00	−72.60	−176.00	−108.00
−230.00	−382.00	43.15	77.67	495.00	−75.90	−184.00	−113.25
−240.00	−400.00	33.15	59.67	510.00	−79.20	−192.00	−118.50
−250.00	−418.00	23.15	41.67	525.00	−82.50	−200.00	−123.75
−260.00	−436.00	13.15	23.67	540.00	−85.80	−208.00	−129.00
−270.00	−454.00	3.15	5.67	555.00	−89.10	−216.00	−134.25
−273.15	−459.67	0.00	0.00	559.725	−90.1395	−218.52	−135.90375
Celsius	Fahrenheit	Kelvin	Rankine	Delisle	Newton	Réaumur	Rømer

== Comparison of temperature scales ==
Comparison of temperature scales
Comment	Kelvin	Celsius	Fahrenheit	Rankine	Delisle	Newton	Réaumur	Rømer
Absolute zero	0.00	−273.15	−459.67	0.00	559.73	−90.14	−218.52	−135.90
Lowest recorded surface temperature on Earth	184	−89.2	−128.6	331	284	−29	−71	−39
Fahrenheit's ice/salt mixture	255.37	−17.78	0.00	459.67	176.67	−5.87	−14.22	−1.83
Ice melts (at standard pressure)	273.15	0.00	32.00	491.67	150.00	0.00	0.00	7.50
Triple point of water	273.16	0.01	32.018	491.688	149.985	0.0033	0.008	7.50525
Average surface temperature on Earth	288	15	59	519	128	5	12	15
Average human body temperature*	310	37	98	558	95	12	29	27
Highest recorded surface temperature on Earth	331	58	136.4	596	63	19	46	38
Water boils (at standard pressure)	373.1339	99.9839	211.97102	671.64102	0.00	33.00	80.00	60.00
Titanium melts	1941	1668	3034	3494	−2352	550	1334	883
The surface of the Sun	5800	5500	9900	10400	−8100	1800	4400	2900

* Normal human body temperature is 36.8 °C ±0.7 °C, or 98.2 °F ±1.3 °F. The commonly given value 98.6 °F is simply the exact conversion of the nineteenth-century German standard of 37 °C. Since it does not list an acceptable range, it could therefore be said to have excess (invalid) precision.

Some numbers in this table have been rounded.

=== Graphical representation ===

Rankine (°R)
Kelvin (K)
Fahrenheit (°F)
Celsius (°C)
Réaumur (°Ré)
Rømer (°Rø)
Newton (°N)
Delisle (°D)

Absolute zero
Lowest recorded surface temperature on Earth
Fahrenheit's ice/water/salt mixture
Melting point of ice (at standard pressure)
Average surface temperature on Earth (15 °C)
Average human body temperature (37 °C)
Highest recorded surface temperature on Earth
Boiling point of water (at standard pressure)

== Converting units of temperature differences ==
For most pairs of scales, converting units of temperature differences (also referred to as temperature deltas) is not the same as converting absolute temperature values, and different formulae must be used.

For example, to convert a change in temperature from degrees Celsius to degrees Fahrenheit, the formula is {ΔT}_{°F} = 9/5{ΔT}_{°C}.

However, a couple exceptions exist, including kelvin (K)/degrees Celsius (°C) and degrees Rankine (°R)/degrees Fahrenheit (°F), where the former of each pair is the resulting scale from the zero-calibration of absolute zero of the latter scale. Because this transformation is a simple additive shift, the magnitude of the unit is perfectly preserved.

As such, a change in temperature given in degrees Celsius (°C) is the same value in kelvin (K), that is: {ΔT}_{K} = {ΔT}_{°C}. Analogously, a change in temperature given in degrees Fahrenheit (°F) is the same value in degrees rankine (°R), that is: {ΔT}_{°R} = {ΔT}_{°F}.

== See also ==
- Outline of metrology and measurement
- Degree of frost
- Conversion of units
- Gas mark
