= Leyden (disambiguation) =

Leyden, or Leiden, is a city and municipality in South Holland, Netherlands.

Leyden or Leiden may also refer to:

== Places in France ==
- Lyon, a major French city

== Places in the United States ==
- Leyden, Colorado
- Leyden, Massachusetts
- Leyden, New York
- Leyden, Wisconsin
- Leyden Street, Plymouth, Massachusetts
- Leyden Township, Cook County, Illinois
- Port Leyden, New York, a village partly within the Town of Leyden, New York

== People ==
- John of Leiden (1509–1536), Dutch Anabaptist leader
- Bill Leyden (1917–1970), American television personality
- John Leyden (1775–1811), British orientalist
- Matt Leyden (c.1904–1975), Canadian ice hockey administrator
- Norman Leyden (1917–2014), American conductor, composer and musician
- Ernst Viktor von Leyden (1832–1910), German physician
- Lucas van Leyden (1494–1533), Dutch engraver and painter

== Science and medicine ==
- Leyden jar, a device for storing electric charge invented in 1745
- Leyden papyrus X (P. Leyden X), a 3rd-century papyrus codex written in Greek
- Leiden scale, a temperature scale
- Factor V Leiden, a variant of human factor V that causes a hypercoagulability disorder
- Papyrus Leiden 334, an Egyptian hieratic papyrus made during the Nineteenth Dynasty

== Sports ==
- B.S. Leiden, a basketball club based in Leiden, Netherlands
- ZVL Leiden, a water polo club in Leiden, Netherlands

== Other uses ==
- Leyden cheese, a spiced cheese made in the Netherlands
- Leiden Conventions, an established set of rules, symbols, and brackets used to indicate the condition of an epigraphic or papyrological text in a modern edition
- The Leiden school, a school of thought in linguistics
- Leiden University, Leiden and The Hague, South Holland, Netherlands
- Leyden High School District 212, Cook County, Illinois
- USS Leyden, the name of United States Navy ships
