= Josias Weitbrecht =

Josias Weitbrecht (Russian: Иосия Вейтбрехт, born 6 November 1702 in Schorndorf, died 28 February 1747 in St. Petersburg) was a German professor of medicine and anatomy in the Russian Empire.

== Life and career ==
After his studies at the University of Tübingen initially Josias Weitbrecht acquired the academic degree for a magister of philosophy. By the medium of Dr Duvernoy in the year 1721 he came to the University of St. Petersburg, where he studied medicine, physiology and anatomy, his main subject, which he taught students from the academic grammar school, associated with the Russian Academy of Science. This academy accepted him as a member in 1725. Later, on 22 January 1730, he was appointed ordinary professor of physiology at this university, but in 1743 he underwent the danger to be released despite best credentials due to the expiry of his agreement but until 1746 he could remain in his position with a freelance contract. Finally due to an intervention of the count Alexei Grigorevich Razumovsky his employment contract could be renewed and Weitbrecht was appointed Full Professor of anatomy in January 1747. Shortly after having restarted officially his work he suddenly died due to the takings resulting from the above mentioned uncertain situation.

In his time Josias Weitbrecht was considered one of the most important anatomists. He described first and foremost the construction and function of the intervertebral disc. Some special foramina, ligaments, cartilages and fibres were named after him. Furthermore in winter 1738 he recalibrated the Delisle thermometers, which usually had 2400 graduations, to a new Delisle scale with 0 degrees as the boiling point and 150 degrees as the freezing point of water. The Delisle thermometer remained in use for almost 100 years in Russia. Altogether 21 articles, where he described his researches, are the basis of new cognitions and he used an excellent style of the Latin language.

Josias Weitbrecht married Katharina Sophia Duran from Copenhagen, and with her had two sons and two daughters.

== Works (optional) ==
- Syndesmologia sive historia ligamentorum corporis humani quam secundum observationes anatomicas concinnavit et figuris ad objecta recentia adumbratis illustravit. Typographia academiae scientiarum, Petropoli (Petersburg) 1742; in Library of Congress:, auch als Mikrofiche-Ausgabe.
- Syndesmology; or, A description of the ligaments of the human body, arranged in accordance with anatomical dissections and illustrated with figures drawn from fresh subjects. Translated by Emanuel B. Kaplan in Library of Congress:.
- Josias Weitbrechts, ... Syndesmologie. Oder die Beschreibung der Bänder des menschlichen Körpers, in einen vollständigen Auszug gebracht, und mit allen dazu gehörigen Figuren versehen. König, Straßburg 1779
- Desmographie ou description des ligamens du corps humain. Durand, Paris 1752; in Library of Congress:.

== Sources ==
- August Hirsch; additioned by Wilhelm Haberling, Franz Hübotter, Hermann Vierordt: Biographisches Lexikon der hervorragenden Ärzte aller Zeiten und Völker. 2nd Edition, part 5, Urban & Schwarzenberg, Berlin und Wien 1934.
- Josias Weitbrecht in the German National Library catalogue
- Josias Weitbrecht in Johann Heinrich Zedlers: Grosses vollständiges Universal-Lexicon aller Wissenschafften und Künste, Seite 748:
