= Degree of frost =

Unit of measurement

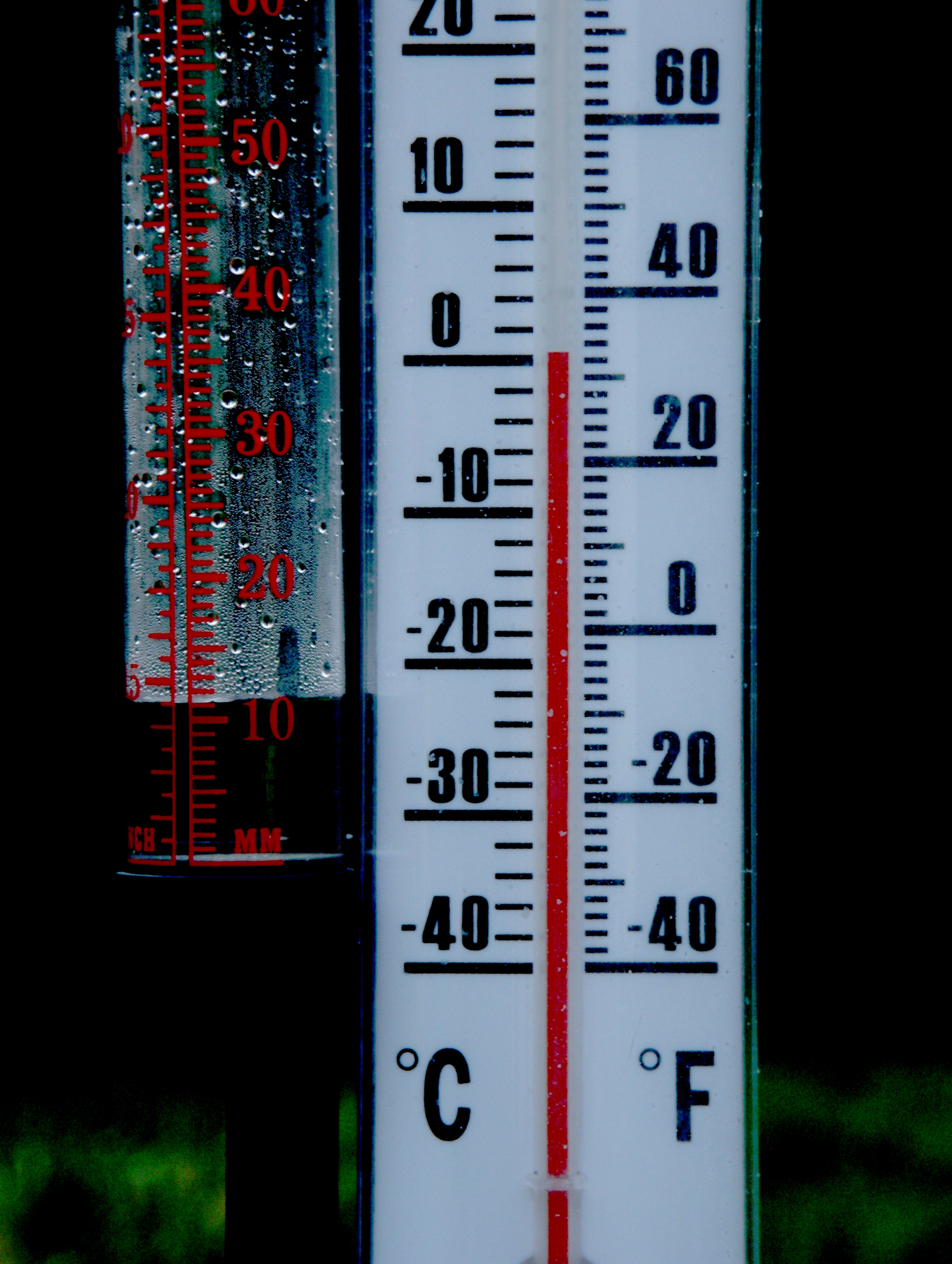
0 °C = 32 °F

A degree of frost is a non-standard unit of measure for air temperature meaning degrees below melting point (also known as "freezing point") of water (0 degrees Celsius or 32 degrees Fahrenheit). "Degree" in this case can refer to degree Celsius or degree Fahrenheit.

When based on Celsius, 0 degrees of frost is the same as 0 °C, and any other value is simply the negative of the Celsius temperature. When based on Fahrenheit, 0 degrees of frost is equal to 32 °F. Conversion formulas:

- T [degrees of frost] = 32 °F − T [°F]
- T [°F] = 32 °F − T [degrees of frost]

The term "degrees of frost" was widely used in accounts of the Heroic Age of Antarctic Exploration in the early 20th century. The term appears frequently in Ernest Shackleton's books South and Heart of the Antarctic, Apsley Cherry-Garrard's account of his Antarctic adventures in The Worst Journey in the World (wherein he recorded 109.5 degrees [Fahrenheit] of frost, −77.5 °F or −60.8 °C), in Jack London's "To Build A Fire", as well as Admiral Richard E. Byrd's book Alone.
