= Joseph-Nicolas Delisle =

French astronomer and cartographer (1688–1768)

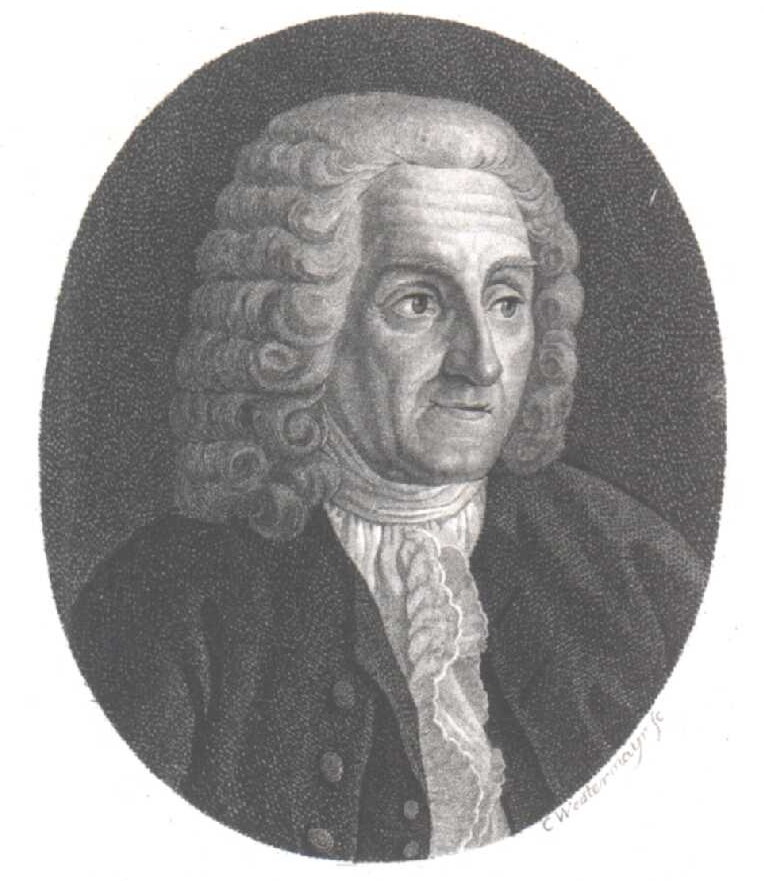
- Born: 4 April 1688; Paris, France
- Died: 11 September 1768 (aged 80); Paris, France
- Known for: Delisle scale Arago spot
- Scientific career
- Fields: Astronomy; Mathematics
- Doctoral advisor: Jacques Cassini
- Doctoral students: Johann Hennert; Jérôme Lalande

Joseph-Nicolas Delisle (French: [ʒozɛf nikɔla dəlil]; 4 April 1688 – 11 September 1768) was a French astronomer and cartographer. Delisle is mostly known for the Delisle scale, a temperature scale he invented in 1732.

== Life ==
Joseph was born in Paris, one of the 11 sons of Claude Delisle (1644–1720). Like many of his brothers, among them Guillaume Delisle, he initially followed classical studies. Soon however, he moved to astronomy under the supervision of Joseph Lieutaud and Jacques Cassini. In 1714 he entered the French Academy of Sciences as pupil of Giacomo Filippo Maraldi. In the next year he discovered the Arago spot a century before François Arago. Though he was a good scientist and member of a wealthy family he did not have much money.

In 1712, he set up an observatory at the Luxembourg Palace and after three years moved to the Hotel de Taranne. From 1719 to 1722 he was employed at the Royal observatory, before returning to his observatory at the Luxembourg Palace. In 1724 he met Edmond Halley in London and, among other things, discussed the transits of Venus.

His life changed radically in 1725 when he was called by the Russian czar Peter the Great to Saint Petersburg to create and run the school of astronomy. He arrived there only in 1726, after the death of the czar. He became quite rich and famous, to such an extent that when he returned to Paris in 1747, he built a new observatory in the palace of Cluny, later made famous by Charles Messier. Also he received the title of Astronomer from the academy. In Russia he prepared the map of the known North Pacific that was used by Vitus Bering.

He was elected a Fellow of the Royal Society in 1725 and a foreign member of the Royal Swedish Academy of Sciences in 1749. In 1760 he proposed that the international scientific community co-ordinate observations of the 1761 transit of Venus to determine the absolute distance of the Earth from the Sun. He developed a map showing where on Earth this transit would be visible and thus where various observing stations should be located. Actual implementation of these observational efforts were hindered by the Seven Years' War. In 1763 he retired to the Abbey of St Genevieve, dying in Paris sometime in 1768.

== Expedition to Siberia ==
In 1740, Delisle undertook an expedition to Siberia with the object of observing from Beryozovo the transit of Mercury across the sun. An account of the expedition is given in Volume 72 of the L'Histoire générale des voyages (1768). Delisle and his party set out from St. Petersburg on 28 February 1740, arriving in Beryozovo, on the bank of the River Ob, on 9 April, having travelled via Moscow, the Volga, and Tyumen. On 22 April, the date of the transit of Mercury, the sun was obscured by clouds, however, and so Delisle was unable to make any astronomical observations. Delisle arrived back in St. Petersburg on 29 December 1740, having sojourned in Tobolsk and Moscow en route.

=== Non-astronomical scientific observations ===
Throughout the expedition, Delisle recorded numerous ornithological, botanical, zoological (e.g. the Siberian beaver), geographical, and other scientific observations. In the "Extrait d'un voyage fait en 1740 à Beresow en Sibérie" published in the Histoire Générale des Voyages, Delisle's ethnographic observations on the native peoples he encountered (the Votyaks, Ostyaks, Tartars, Voguls, and Chuvash) include details of their religious beliefs, marital customs, means of subsistence, diet, and costume. It seems that Delisle even planned to write a general study of the peoples of Siberia. In Delisle's unpublished papers there is a document entitled "Ordre des informations à faire sur chaque différente nation", which gives a structured outline of the ethnographic data to be collected for each particular Siberian nation: its history, geographical area, relations with other ruling powers, system of government, religion (e.g. belief in God, the Devil, life after death), knowledge in the arts and sciences, physical characteristics, costume, occupations, tools, mores, dwellings, and language.

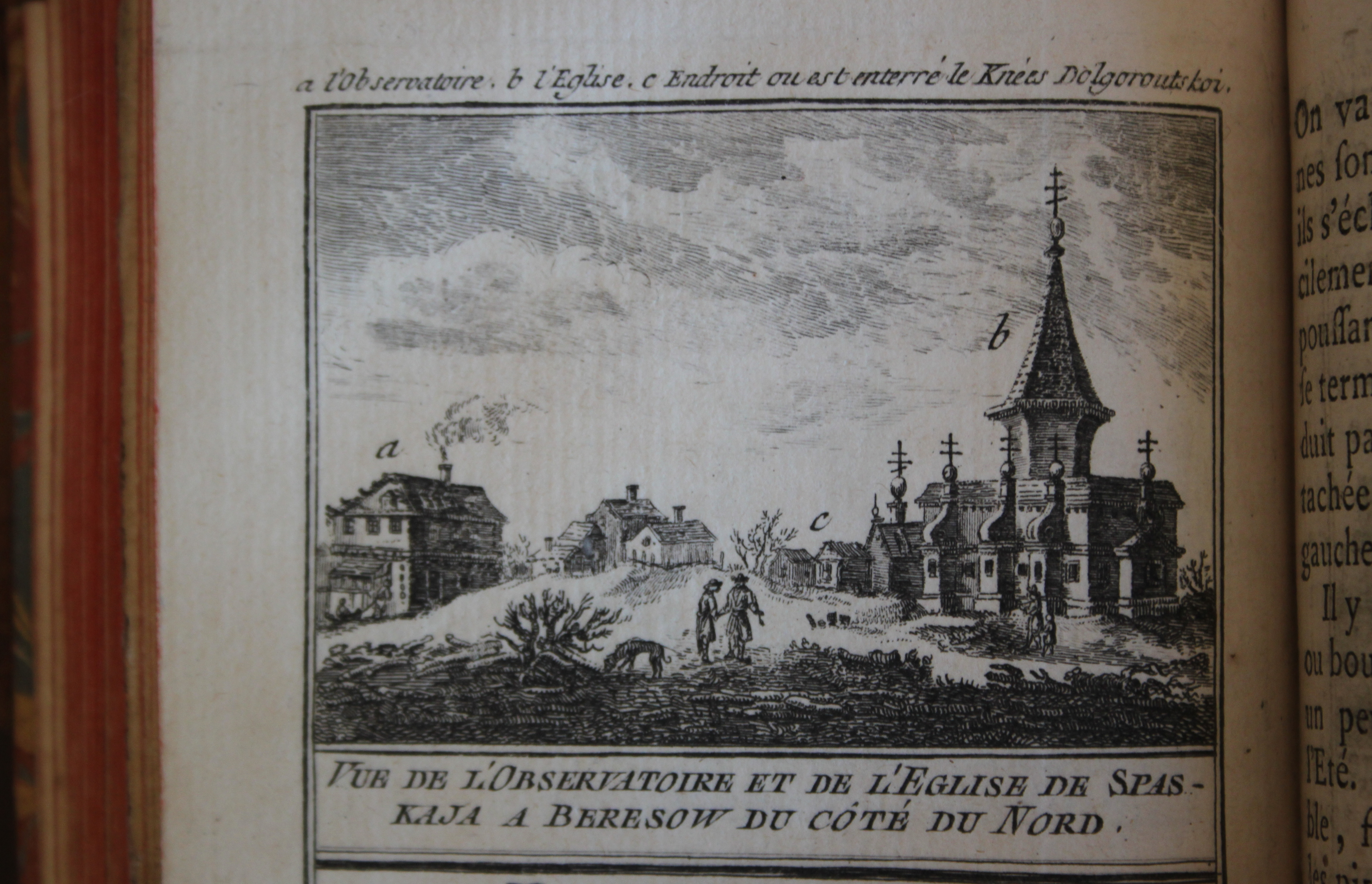
Delisle's observatory in Beryozovo (marked a.), from Continuation de l'histoire générale des voyages, vol. 72 (1768)

=== Delisle's "cabinet de curiosité" ===
On 30 June 1740, Delisle visited a monastery in Tobolsk, where in addition to Russian and Old Church Slavonic manuscripts he was shown a mammoth tusk and other bones "d'une grandeur extraordinaire". The abbot recounted to Delisle that the previous year (1739) a Siberian merchant by the name of Fugla, already famous for his prodigious strength (he had fought and killed a bear with his bare hands), further added to his fame when he found near Yeniseisk an intact mammoth head "d'une grosseur étonnante." Delisle himself was an indefatigable collector and during his Siberian expedition he took every opportunity to add to his "cabinet de curiosité", bringing back with him not only copies of manuscripts and mammoth bones like those he had seen in Tobolsk, but also "objets hétéroclites," which included items of Ostyak costume, a Samoyed quiver, a bark bucket, rare stones, and Tobolsk porcelain ware.

== The Atlas Rossicus ==
The plan for a map of the Russian Empire was launched by Peter the Great, but did not come to fruition until two decades later, in the reign of Empress Anna. Ivan Kirilov (1689–1737), the first director of the imperial Cartographic Office, had Delisle officially invited to Russia with a view to his collaborating on the proposed map of the empire. However, Delisle and Kirilov clashed on how best to draw up the maps, with the former favouring the establishment of a network of astronomically determined points, a very time-consuming process, and the latter arguing for surveying based on geographical features as reference points, subsequently to be adjusted to the astronomically determined points. Using his own methods, but consulting Delisle for expert advice, Kirilov published in 1734 a general map and the first fourteen regional maps of an intended series of 120. The edition was abandoned after Kirilov's death in 1737. It was not until 1745 that the academy in Saint Petersburg finally published a complete Atlas Rossicus, in Latin and Cyrillic script, consisting of a general map and 29 regional maps (Атлас Российской/Atlas Rossicus, Petropoli, 1745–1746). Delisle worked on the atlas in the 1730s, but his extreme scientific rigour considerably slowed its progress. For this reason, in 1740, while he was absent from the capital, undertaking his expedition to Siberia, Delisle was officially dismissed from the supervisory board in charge of the atlas. Schumacher, the secretary of the academy, even went so far as to accuse him of sending secret documents to France. Increasingly isolated at court, Delisle requested permission to leave Russia in 1743, which was granted four years later. In the meantime, the Atlas Rossicus was submitted for publication in Delisle's name. In History of Cartography, Leo Bagrow argues that "by rights [the atlas] should not bear his name," but Marie-Anne Chabin, an expert on Delisle's life and unpublished manuscripts, concludes: "Despite all, Joseph-Nicolas Delisle should be regarded as its main architect."

== Publications ==
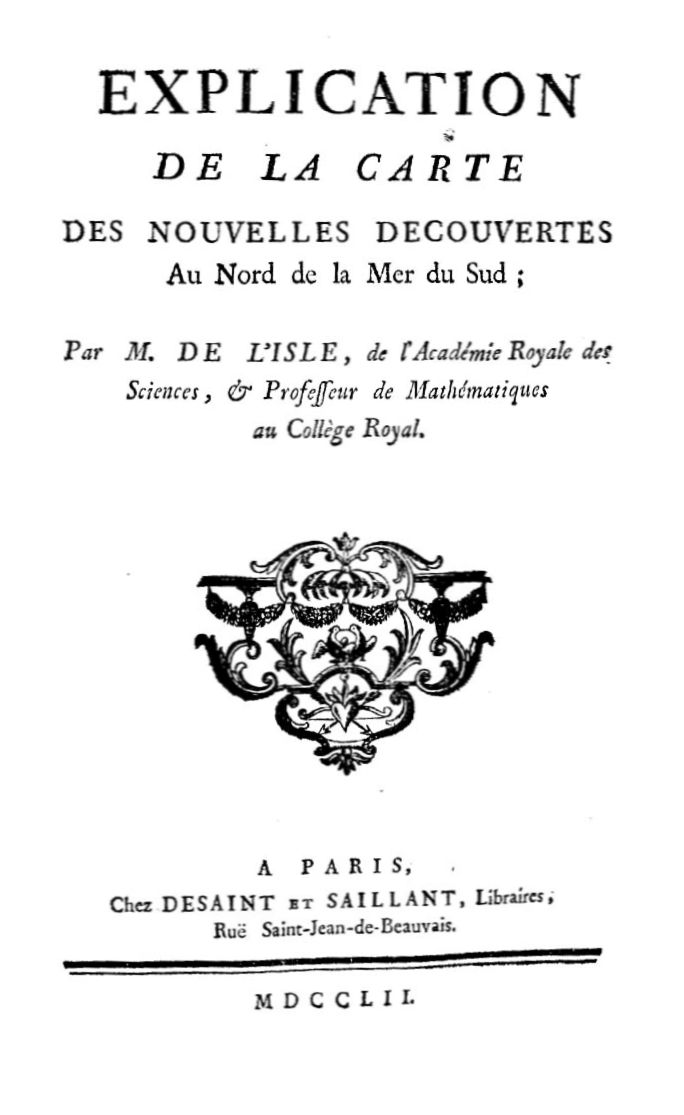
Explication de la carte des nouvelles decouvertes au nord de la mer du Sud, 1752

- Joseph-Nicolas Delisle (1738). Mémoires pour servir à l'histoire et aux progrès de l'Astronomie, de la Géographie et de la Physique (in French). l'Imprimerie de l'Académie des Sciences.
- Joseph-Nicolas Delisle (1752). Explication de la carte des nouvelles decouvertes au nord de la mer du Sud (in French). Paris: Jean Desaint & Charles Saillant.

== Legacy ==
Delisle is mostly known for the Delisle scale, a temperature scale he invented in 1732. The crater Delisle on the Moon, and the asteroid 12742 Delisle are named after him.

== Sources ==
- "Делиль, Жозеф-Никола" . Brockhaus and Efron Encyclopedic Dictionary (in Russian). 1906.
