= Kelvin =

SI unit of temperature

kelvin
- Equivalent temperatures in the Kelvin (K), Celsius (°C), and Fahrenheit (°F) scales

General information
- Unit system: SI
- Unit of: temperature
- Symbol: K
- Named after: William Thomson, 1st Baron Kelvin
- 2019 definition: k_{B} ≝ 1.380649×10^{−23} J/K

Conversions
273.15 K in ...	... corresponds to ...
- Celsius: 0 °C
- Fahrenheit: 32 °F
- Rankine scale: 491.67 °Ra

The kelvin (symbol: K) is the base unit for temperature in the International System of Units (SI). The Kelvin scale is an absolute temperature scale that starts at the lowest possible temperature (absolute zero), taken to be 0 K. By definition, the units of the Celsius scale (symbol °C) and the Kelvin scale have the same magnitude (that is, a rise in temperature of one kelvin and a rise of 1 °C are both equal to 1 K), and any temperature in degrees Celsius can be converted to the kelvin scale by adding 273.15.

The 19th-century British scientist Lord Kelvin first developed and proposed the scale. It was often called the "absolute Celsius" scale in the early 20th century. The kelvin was formally added to the International System of Units in 1954, defining 273.16 K to be the temperature of the triple point of water (0.01 °C). The Celsius, Fahrenheit, and Rankine scales were redefined in terms of the Kelvin scale using this definition. The 2019 revision of the SI now defines the kelvin in terms of energy by setting the Boltzmann constant; every 1 K change of thermodynamic temperature corresponds to a change in the thermal energy, k_{B}T, of exactly 1.380649×10^{−23} joules.

== History ==
=== Precursors ===
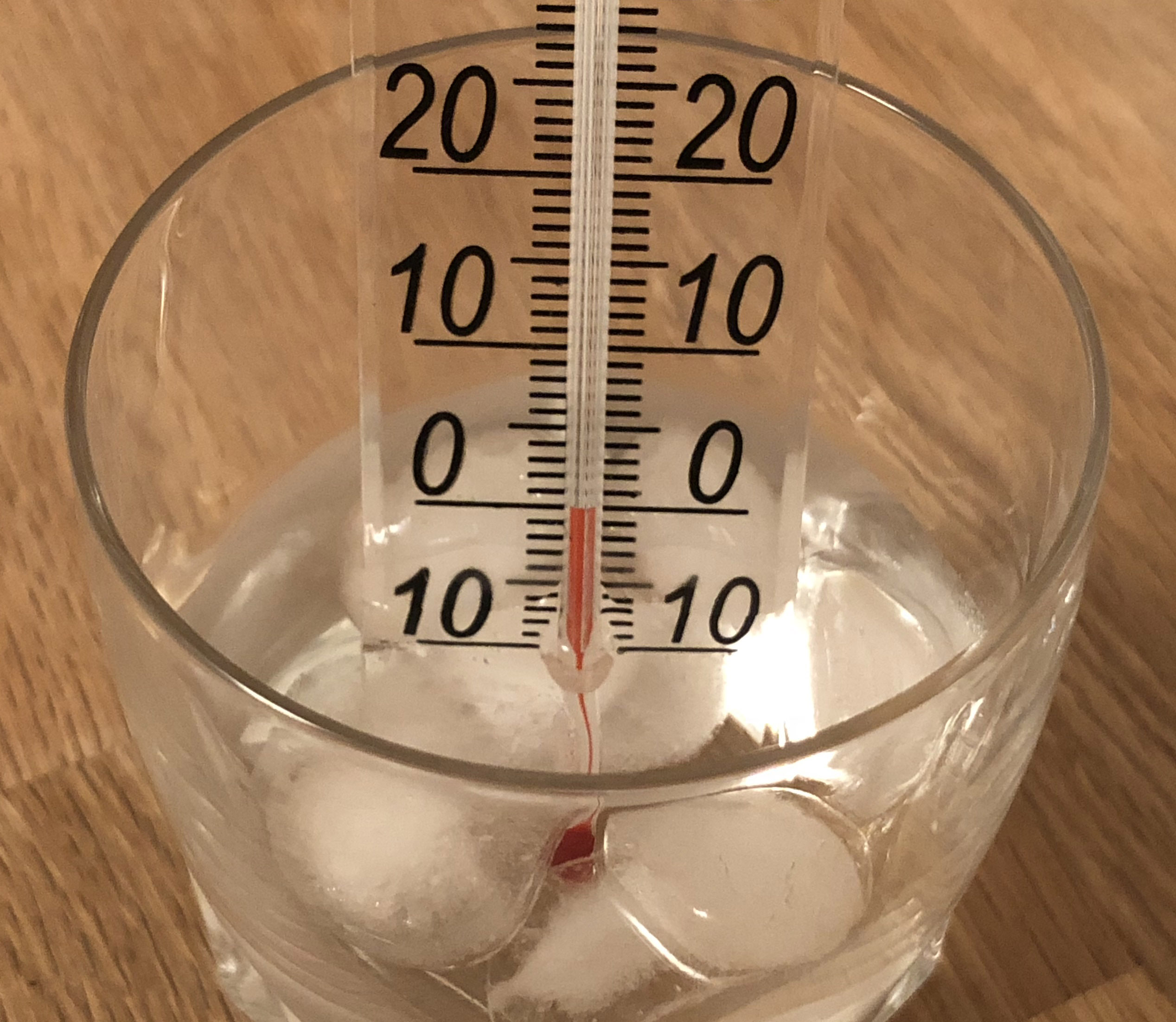
An ice water bath offered a practical calibration point for thermometers (shown here in Celsius) before the physical nature of heat was well understood.

During the 18th century, multiple temperature scales were developed, notably Fahrenheit and Celsius. These scales predated much of the modern science of thermodynamics, including atomic theory and the kinetic theory of gases which underpin the concept of absolute zero. Instead, they chose defining points within the range of human experience that could be reproduced easily and with reasonable accuracy, but lacked any deep significance in thermal physics. In the case of the Celsius scale (and the long defunct Newton and Réaumur scales) the melting point of ice served as such a starting point, with Celsius being defined (from the 1740s to the 1940s) by calibrating a thermometer such that:

- Water's freezing point is 0 °C.
- Water's boiling point is 100 °C.

This definition assumes pure water at a specific pressure chosen to approximate the natural air pressure at sea level. Thus, an increment of 1 °C equals 1/100 of the temperature difference between the melting and boiling points. The same temperature interval was later used for the Kelvin scale.

=== Charles's law ===
From 1787 to 1802, it was determined by Jacques Charles (unpublished), John Dalton, and Joseph Louis Gay-Lussac that, at constant pressure, ideal gases expanded or contracted their volume linearly (Charles's law) by about 1/273 parts per degree Celsius of temperature's change up or down, between 0 °C and 100 °C. Extrapolation of this law suggested that a gas cooled to about −273 °C would occupy zero volume.

=== Lord Kelvin ===
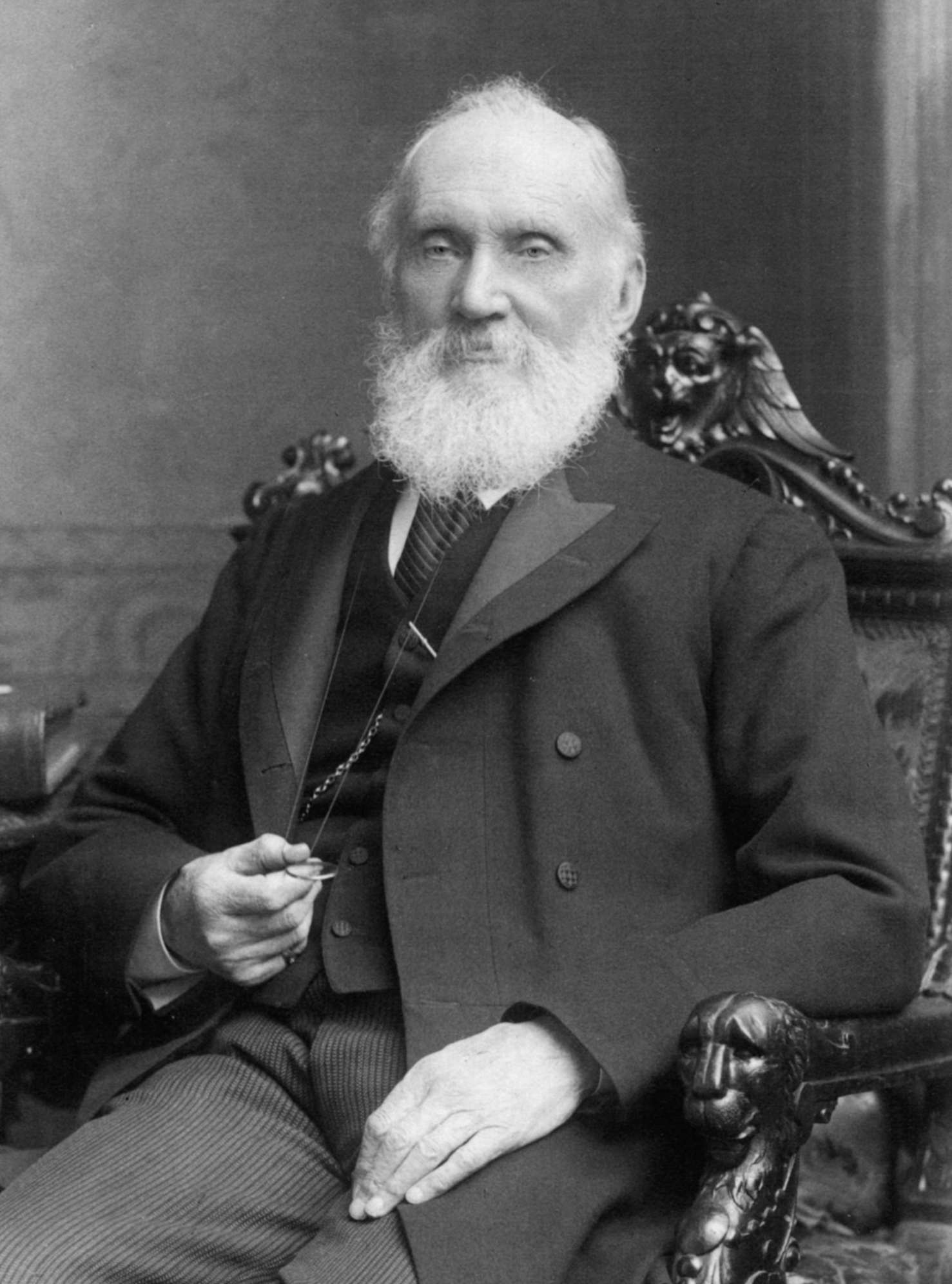
Lord Kelvin, the namesake of the unit of measure.

==== First absolute scale ====
In 1848, William Thomson, who was later ennobled as Lord Kelvin, published a paper On an Absolute Thermometric Scale. The scale proposed in the paper turned out to be unsatisfactory, but the principles and formulas upon which the scale was based were correct. For example, in a footnote, Thomson derived the value of −273 °C for absolute zero by calculating the negative reciprocal of 0.00366—the coefficient of thermal expansion of an ideal gas per degree Celsius relative to the ice point. This derived value agrees with the currently accepted value of −273.15 °C, allowing for the precision and uncertainty involved in the calculation.

The scale was designed on the principle that "a unit of heat descending from a body A at the temperature T° of this scale, to a body B at the temperature (T − 1)°, would give out the same mechanical effect, whatever be the number T." Specifically, Thomson expressed the amount of work necessary to produce a unit of heat (the thermal efficiency) as $\mu(t) (1 + E t)/E$, where $t$ is the temperature in Celsius, $E$ is the coefficient of thermal expansion, and $\mu(t)$ was "Carnot's function", a substance-independent quantity depending on temperature, motivated by an obsolete version of Carnot's theorem. The scale is derived by finding a change of variables $T_{1848} = f(T)$ of temperature $T$ such that $dT_{1848} / dT$ is proportional to $\mu$.

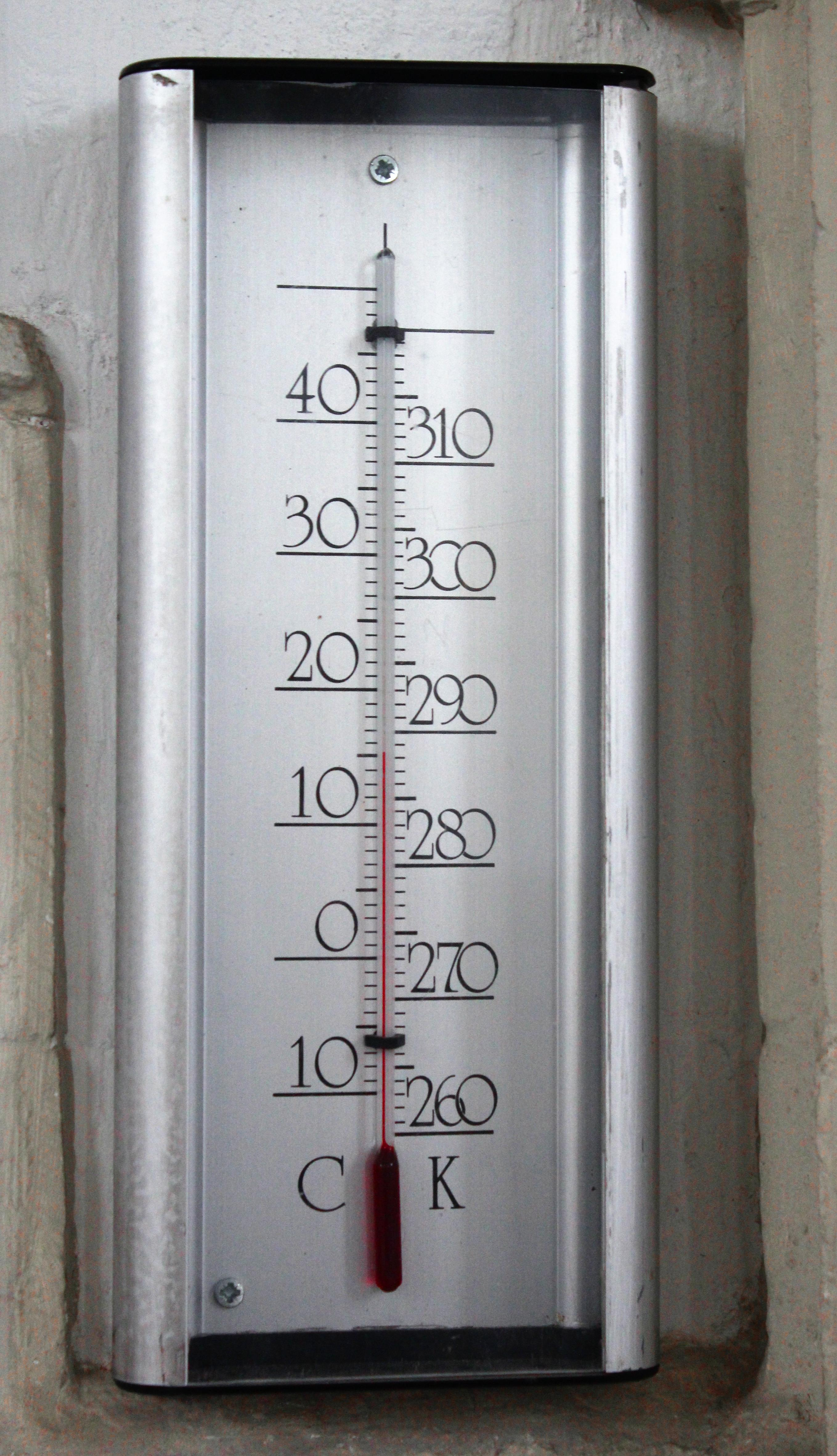
Thermometer showing temperature in kelvin and degrees Celsius

When Thomson published his paper in 1848, he only considered Regnault's experimental measurements of $\mu(t)$. That same year, James Prescott Joule suggested to Thomson that the true formula for Carnot's function was
$$\mu(t) = J \frac{E}{1+E t},$$
where $J$ is "the mechanical equivalent of a unit of heat", now referred to as the specific heat capacity of water, approximately 771.8 foot-pounds force per degree Fahrenheit per pound (4,153 J/K/kg). Thomson was initially sceptical of the deviations in Joule's formula from the experiment, stating "I think it will be generally admitted that there can be no such inaccuracy in Regnault's part of the data, and there remains only the uncertainty regarding the density of saturated steam". Thomson referred to the correctness of Joule's formula as "Mayer's hypothesis", on account of it having been first assumed by Mayer. Thomson arranged numerous experiments in coordination with Joule, eventually concluding by 1854 that Joule's formula was correct and the effect of temperature on the density of saturated steam accounted for all discrepancies with Regnault's data. Therefore, in terms of the modern Kelvin scale $T$, the first scale could be expressed as follows:
$$T_{1848} = 100  \frac{\log(T / \text{273 K})}{\log(\text{373 K} / \text{273 K})}$$
The parameters of the scale were arbitrarily chosen to coincide with the Celsius scale at 0° and 100 °C or 273 and 373 K (the melting and boiling points of water). On this scale, an increase of approximately 222 degrees corresponds to a doubling of Kelvin temperature, regardless of the starting temperature, and "infinite cold" (absolute zero) has a numerical value of negative infinity.

==== Modern absolute scale ====
Thomson understood that with Joule's proposed formula for $\mu$, the relationship between work and heat for a perfect thermodynamic engine was simply the constant $J$. In 1854, Thomson and Joule thus formulated a second absolute scale that was more practical and convenient, agreeing with air thermometers for most purposes. Specifically, "the numerical measure of temperature shall be simply the mechanical equivalent of the thermal unit divided by Carnot's function."

To explain this definition, consider a reversible Carnot cycle engine, where $Q_\mathrm{H}$ is the amount of heat energy transferred into the system, $Q_\mathrm{C}$ is the heat leaving the system, $W$ is the work done by the system ($Q_\mathrm{H} - Q_\mathrm{C}$), $t_\mathrm{H}$ is the temperature of the hot reservoir in degrees Celsius, and $t_\mathrm{C}$ is the temperature of the cold reservoir in Celsius. The Carnot function is defined as $\mu =W / Q_\mathrm{H}(t_\mathrm{H} - t_\mathrm{C})$, and the absolute temperature as $T_\mathrm{H} = J/\mu$. One finds the relationship $T_\mathrm{H}= J Q_\mathrm{H} (t_\mathrm{H}-t_\mathrm{C})/W$. By supposing $T_\mathrm{H}-T_\mathrm{C}=J (t_\mathrm{H}-t_\mathrm{C})$, one obtains the general principle of an absolute thermodynamic temperature scale for the Carnot engine, $Q_\mathrm{H} / T_\mathrm{H} = Q_\mathrm{C} / T_\mathrm{C}$. The definition can be shown to correspond to the thermometric temperature of the ideal gas laws.

This definition by itself is not sufficient. Thomson specified that the scale should have two properties:

- The absolute values of two temperatures are to one another in the proportion of the heat taken in to the heat rejected in a perfect thermodynamic engine working with a source and refrigerator at the higher and lower of the temperatures respectively.
- The difference of temperatures between the freezing- and boiling-points of water under standard atmospheric pressure shall be called 100 degrees. (The same increment as the Celsius scale) Thomson's best estimates at the time were that the temperature of freezing water was 273.7 K and the temperature of boiling water was 373.7 K.

These two properties would be featured in all future versions of the Kelvin scale, although it was not yet known by that name. In the early decades of the 20th century, the Kelvin scale was often called the "absolute Celsius" scale, indicating Celsius degrees counted from absolute zero rather than the freezing point of water, and using the same symbol for regular Celsius degrees, °C.

=== Triple point standard ===
A typical phase diagram. The solid green line applies to most substances; the dashed green line gives the anomalous behaviour of water. The boiling line (solid blue) runs from the triple point to the critical point, beyond which further increases in temperature and pressure produce a supercritical fluid.

In 1873, William Thomson's older brother James coined the term triple point to describe the combination of temperature and pressure at which the solid, liquid, and gas phases of a substance were capable of coexisting in thermodynamic equilibrium. While any two phases could coexist along a range of temperature-pressure combinations (e.g. the boiling point of water can be affected quite dramatically by raising or lowering the pressure), the triple point condition for a given substance can occur only at a single pressure and only at a single temperature. By the 1940s, the triple point of water had been experimentally measured to be about 0.6% of standard atmospheric pressure and very close to 0.01 °C per the historical definition of Celsius then in use.

In 1948, the Celsius scale was recalibrated by assigning the triple point temperature of water the value of 0.01 °C exactly and allowing the melting point at standard atmospheric pressure to have an empirically determined value (and the actual melting point at ambient pressure to have a fluctuating value) close to 0 °C. This was justified on the grounds that the triple point was judged to give a more accurately reproducible reference temperature than the melting point. The triple point could be measured with ±0.0001 °C accuracy, while the melting point just to ±0.001 °C.

In 1954, with absolute zero having been experimentally determined to be about −273.15 °C per the definition of °C then in use, Resolution 3 of the 10th General Conference on Weights and Measures (CGPM) introduced a new internationally standardised Kelvin scale which defined the triple point as exactly 273.15 + 0.01 = 273.16 degrees Kelvin.

In 1967/1968, Resolution 3 of the 13th CGPM renamed the unit increment of thermodynamic temperature "kelvin", symbol K, replacing "degree Kelvin", symbol °K. The 13th CGPM also held in Resolution 4 that "The kelvin, unit of thermodynamic temperature, is equal to the fraction 1/273.16 of the thermodynamic temperature of the triple point of water."

After the 1983 redefinition of the metre, this left the kelvin, the second, and the kilogram as the only SI units not defined with reference to any other unit.

In 2005, noting that the triple point could be influenced by the isotopic ratio of the hydrogen and oxygen making up a water sample and that this was "now one of the major sources of the observed variability between different realizations of the water triple point", the International Committee for Weights and Measures (CIPM), a committee of the CGPM, affirmed that for the purposes of delineating the temperature of the triple point of water, the definition of the kelvin would refer to water having the isotopic composition specified for Vienna Standard Mean Ocean Water.

=== 2019 redefinition ===
2019 SI unit dependencies. The kelvin (K) is now fixed in terms of the Boltzmann constant (k_{B}) and the joule. The joule is not shown because it is a derived unit defined by the metre (m), second (s), and kilogram (kg). Those SI base units are themselves defined by the universal constants of the speed of light (c), the caesium-133 hyperfine transition frequency (Δν_{Cs}) and the Planck constant (h). Black arrows trace the dependencies from these constants to the kelvin.

The Boltzmann constant k_{B} serves as the bridge in the relation E = k_{B}T, linking characteristic microscopic energies to the macroscopic temperature scale. In the International System of Units (SI), the kelvin has traditionally been treated as an independent base unit with its own dimension. By contrast, in fundamental physics it is common to adopt natural units by setting the Boltzmann constant equal to unity, so that temperature and energy share the same units.

In 2005, the CIPM began a programme to redefine the kelvin in terms of the Boltzmann constant, alongside exploring new definitions for several other SI base units in terms of fundamental constants. The motivation was to allow more accurate measurements at temperatures far away from the triple point of water, and to be independent from any particular substance or measurement. Originally slated for adoption in 2011 with the Boltzmann constant being 1.38065X×10^{−23} J/K, X to be determined, concerns arose about maintaining the precision of the triple point, and the redefinition was postponed until such time as more accurate measurements could be made, with these experiments taking several years in some cases. Ultimately, the kelvin redefinition became part of the larger 2019 revision of the SI. In late 2018, the 26th General Conference on Weights and Measures (CGPM) adopted the value of k_{B} = 1.380649×10^{−23} J⋅K^{−1} and the new definition officially came into force on 20 May 2019, the 144th anniversary of the Metre Convention.

With this new definition, the kelvin now only depends on the Boltzmann constant and universal constants (see 2019 SI unit dependencies diagram), allowing the kelvin to be expressed as:

1 kelvin = (1.380649×10^{−23})/((6.62607015×10^{−34})(9192631770)) hΔν_{Cs}/k_{B} ≈ 2.2666653 hΔν_{Cs}/k_{B}.

In practical terms, as was the goal, the change went largely unnoticed: the chosen value has enough accuracy and significant figures for continuity, ensuring that water still freezes at 0 °C to high precision. The difference lies in the status of reference points. Before the redefinition, the triple point of water was taken as exact, while the Boltzmann constant had a measured value of 1.38064903(51)×10^{−23} J/K, with a relative standard uncertainty of 3.7×10^{−7}. Afterward, the Boltzmann constant was exact and the uncertainty is transferred to the triple point of water, which is now 273.1600(1) K. (Note: The absolute uncertainty can be calculated as 273.16 × 3.7×10^{−7} K, which can be rounded to 0.10 mK for all practical purposes.)

On a deeper level, the kelvin is now defined in terms of the joule, making the separate existence of a temperature dimension theoretically unnecessary. The kelvin could have been redefined as a non-coherent derived SI unit, with 1 K = 1.380649×10^{−23} J. Yet, "for historical and especially practical reasons, the kelvin will continue to be a base unit of the SI".

== Practical uses ==
Colour temperature (right) of various light sources (left)

=== Colour temperature ===
The kelvin is often used as a measure of the colour temperature of light sources. Colour temperature is based upon the principle that a black body radiator emits light with a frequency distribution characteristic of its temperature. Black bodies at temperatures below about 4000 K appear reddish, whereas those above about 7500 K appear bluish. Colour temperature is important in the fields of image projection and photography, where a colour temperature of approximately 5600 K is required to match "daylight" film emulsions.

In astronomy, the stellar classification of stars and their place on the Hertzsprung–Russell diagram are based, in part, upon their surface temperature, known as effective temperature. The photosphere of the Sun, for instance, has an effective temperature of 5772 K as adopted by IAU 2015 Resolution B3.

Digital cameras and photographic software often use colour temperature in K in edit and setup menus. The simple guide is that higher colour temperature produces an image with enhanced white and blue hues. The reduction in colour temperature produces an image more dominated by reddish, "warmer" colours.

=== Kelvin as a unit of noise temperature ===
For electronics, the kelvin is used as an indicator of how noisy a circuit is in relation to an ultimate noise floor, i.e. the noise temperature. The Johnson–Nyquist noise of resistors (which produces an associated kTC noise when combined with capacitors) is a type of thermal noise derived from the Boltzmann constant and can be used to determine the noise temperature of a circuit using the Friis formulas for noise.

== Derived units and SI multiples ==
The only SI derived unit with a special name derived from the kelvin is the degree Celsius. Like other SI units, the kelvin can also be modified by adding a metric prefix that multiplies it by a power of 10:

SI multiples of kelvin (K)
Submultiples			Multiples		
Value	SI symbol	Name	Value	SI symbol	Name
10^{−1} K	dK	decikelvin	10^{1} K	daK	decakelvin
10^{−2} K	cK	centikelvin	10^{2} K	hK	hectokelvin
10^{−3} K	mK	millikelvin	10^{3} K	kK	kilokelvin
10^{−6} K	μK	microkelvin	10^{6} K	MK	megakelvin
10^{−9} K	nK	nanokelvin	10^{9} K	GK	gigakelvin
10^{−12} K	pK	picokelvin	10^{12} K	TK	terakelvin
10^{−15} K	fK	femtokelvin	10^{15} K	PK	petakelvin
10^{−18} K	aK	attokelvin	10^{18} K	EK	exakelvin
10^{−21} K	zK	zeptokelvin	10^{21} K	ZK	zettakelvin
10^{−24} K	yK	yoctokelvin	10^{24} K	YK	yottakelvin
10^{−27} K	rK	rontokelvin	10^{27} K	RK	ronnakelvin
10^{−30} K	qK	quectokelvin	10^{30} K	QK	quettakelvin

== Orthography ==
According to SI convention, the kelvin is never referred to nor written as a degree. The word "kelvin" is not capitalised when used as a unit. It may be in plural form as appropriate (for example, "it is 283 kelvins outside", as for "it is 50 degrees Fahrenheit" and "10 degrees Celsius"). The unit's symbol K is a capital letter, per the SI convention to capitalise symbols of units derived from the name of a person. It is common convention to capitalise Kelvin when referring to Lord Kelvin or the Kelvin scale.

The unit symbol K is encoded in Unicode at code point U+212A K KELVIN SIGN. However, this is a compatibility character provided for compatibility with legacy encodings. The Unicode standard recommends using U+004B K LATIN CAPITAL LETTER K instead; that is, a normal capital K. "Three letterlike symbols have been given canonical equivalence to regular letters: U+2126 Ω OHM SIGN, U+212A K KELVIN SIGN, and U+212B Å ANGSTROM SIGN. In all three instances, the regular letter should be used."

== See also ==
- Comparison of temperature scales
- International Temperature Scale of 1990
- kT (energy) – product of the Boltzmann constant and temperature
- Negative temperature
- Outline of metrology and measurement

Obsolete temperature scales include:

- Rømer scale
- Réaumur scale
- Delisle scale
- Newton scale
- Leiden scale

== Bibliography ==
- Bureau International des Poids et Mesures (2019). "The International System of Units (SI) Brochure" (PDF). 9th Edition. International Committee for Weights and Measures.
- Thomson, William (Lord Kelvin) (1882). Mathematical and physical papers: Volume I. Cambridge University Press.
