= Absolute scale =

Scale level in statistics

There is no single definition of an absolute scale. In statistics and measurement theory, it is simply a ratio scale in which the unit of measurement is fixed, and values are obtained by counting. Another definition tells us it is the count of the elements in a set, with its natural origin being zero, the empty set. Some sources tell us that even time can be measured in an absolute scale, proving year zero is measured from the beginning of the universe. Colloquially, the Kelvin temperature scale, where absolute zero is the temperature at which molecular energy is at a minimum, and the Rankine temperature scale are also referred to as absolute scales. In that case, an absolute scale is a system of measurement that begins at a minimum, or zero point, and progresses in only one direction.

== Uses ==
Absolute scales are used when precise values are needed in comparison to a natural, unchanging zero point. Measurements of length, area and volume are inherently absolute, although measurements of distance are often based on an arbitrary starting point. Measurements of weight can be absolute, such as atomic weight, but more often they are measurements of the relationship between two masses, while measurements of speed are relative to an arbitrary reference frame. (Unlike many other measurements without a known, absolute minimum, speed has a known maximum and can be measured from a purely relative scale.) Absolute scales can be used for measuring a variety of things, from the flatness of an optical flat to neuroscientific tests.
