= Leiden scale =

Unit of temperature

The Leiden scale (°L or ÐL) is a temperature scale that was used to calibrate low-temperature indirect measurements in the early 20th century, by providing conventional values (in kelvins, then termed "degrees Kelvin") of helium vapour pressure. The scale dates back at around 1894, when Heike Kamerlingh Onnes established his cryogenics laboratory in Leiden, Netherlands. It was used below −183 °C, the starting point of the International Temperature Scale in the 1930s (Awbery 1934). The boiling points of standard hydrogen (−253 °C), consisting of 75% orthohydrogen and 25% parahydrogen, and oxygen (−183 °C) were used as fixed points, corresponding to zero and 70 on the scale respectively.

== See also ==
- Outline of metrology and measurement
