= Gas mark =

Temperature scale used on ovens

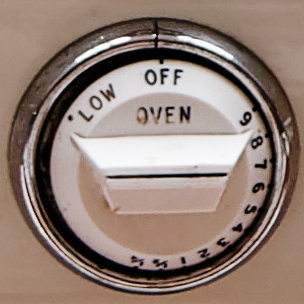
A Parkinson Cowan Prince gas cooker dial with a gas mark scale

The gas mark is a temperature scale used on gas ovens and cookers in the United Kingdom, Ireland and some Commonwealth of Nations countries.

== History ==
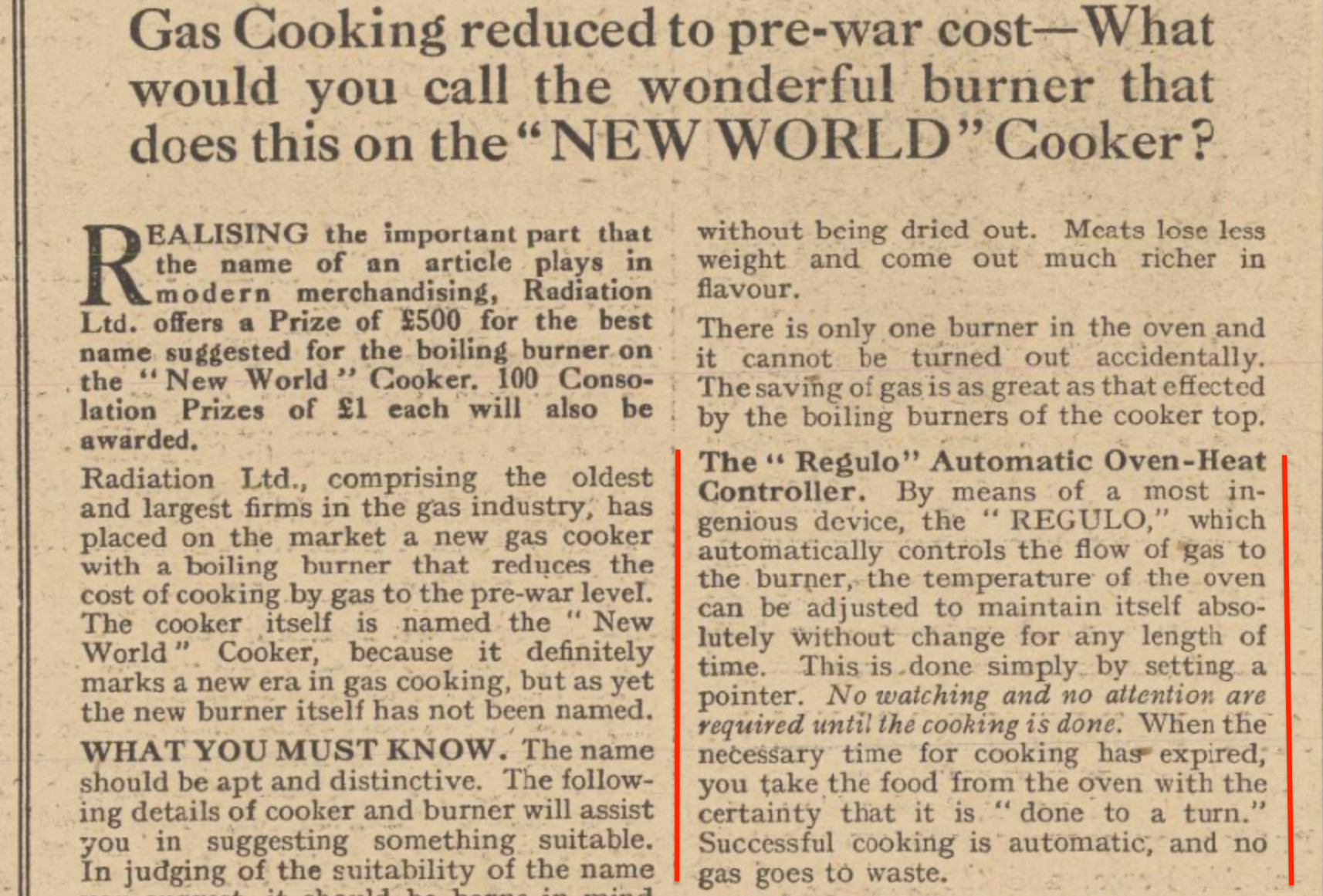
First advertisement for Regulo, 1923

Early gas ovens had no thermostats and it was up to the cook to continually adjust a manual valve to keep the oven at the desired temperature. For this and other reasons gas cookers were not popular; most users preferred the coal-fired open kitchen range. The breakthrough came in the 1920s when a manufacturer introduced the Regulo. REGULO was originally a proprietary name chosen by Radiation Ltd. to denote their new automatic temperature controller. In a series of press advertisements published on 13 May 1923 to announce their "New World" cooker it was stated that, by simply setting a pointer, the oven would go to the desired temperature and stay there without requiring further attention. The current (2025) online edition of the Oxford English Dictionary indicates that Radiation Ltd. applied to register Regulo as a trade mark in 1922; the same source cites The Economist (1936) as saying "The 'New World' cooker, with the 'Regulo'... revolutionised gas cooking". The pointer was calibrated in units of their own choosing, and since it was adopted by most gas cookers, Regulo has become generic as the name for the temperature scale itself.

The term "gas mark", now synonymous with regulo, was a subject of the joint BBC/OED production Balderdash and Piffle, in May 2005. The earliest printed evidence of use of "gas mark" (with no other terms between the two words) appears to date from 1958.

== Equivalents in Fahrenheit and Celsius ==
Gas mark 1 is 275 °F (135 °C).

Oven temperatures increase by 25 °F (14 °C) for each gas mark step. Above Gas Mark 1, the scale markings increase by one for each step. Below Gas Mark 1, the scale markings halve at each step, each representing a decrease of 25 °F (14 °C).

=== Formulae ===
In theory, the following formulae can be used to convert between gas mark values and Celsius.

For temperatures above 135 °C (gas mark 1), to convert gas mark to degrees Celsius ($C$), multiply the gas mark number ($G$) by 14, then add 121:

$$\left ( G \times 14 \right ) + 121 = C$$

For the reverse conversion:

$$G =  \frac { \left ( C - 121 \right ) }{14}$$

These do not work for $G$ less than 1, since the steps are given as halves (i.e., 1/2, 1/4). For temperatures below 135 °C (gas mark 1), to convert gas mark to degrees Celsius apply the following conversion:

$$C = \frac {243 - (25 \times \log_{2} (G^{-1}))} {1.8}$$

For the reverse:

$G = 2^{(1.8C - 243) / 25}$

Note that tables of temperature equivalents for kitchen use conventionally round Celsius values to the nearest 10 degrees, with steps of either 10 or 20 degrees between Gas Marks.

=== Conversion table ===
In practice, of course, a conversion table is used instead of the above formulae. The numbers in the conversion table below represent values that would actually be given in a recipe or set on a stove.

Conversion table
| Gas Mark | Fahrenheit | Celsius | Description |
|---|---|---|---|
| 1/4 | 225 | 110 | Very slow/Very low/Very cool |
| 1/2 | 250 | 120 | Very slow/Very low/Very cool |
| 1 | 275 | 140 | Slow/Low/Cool |
| 2 | 300 | 150 | Slow/Low/Cool |
| 3 | 325 | 170 | Moderately slow/Warm/Moderate |
| 4 | 350 | 180 | Moderate/Medium |
| 5 | 375 | 190 | Moderate/Moderately hot |
| 6 | 400 | 200 | Moderately hot |
| 7 | 425 | 220 | Hot |
| 8 | 450 | 230 | Hot/Very hot |
| 9 | 475 | 240 | Very hot |
| 10 (less common) | 500 | 260 | Extremely hot |

== Other cooking temperature scales ==
=== France: Thermostat ===
French ovens and recipes use a scale called the "Thermostat" (abbreviated "Th") that is based on the Celsius scale. Thermostat 1 equals 30 °C for conventional ovens, increasing by 30 °C for each whole number along the scale.

| Thermostat | 1 | 2 | 3 | 4 | 5 | 6 | 7 | 8 | 9 |
| Approx. Temp. | 30 °C | 60 °C | 90 °C | 120 °C | 150 °C | 180 °C | 210 °C | 240 °C | 270 °C |

=== Germany: Stufe ===
In Germany, "Stufe" (the German word for "step") is used for gas cooking temperatures. Gas ovens are commonly marked in steps from 1 to 8, corresponding to:

| Stufe | 1 | 2 | 3 | 4 | 5 | 6 | 7 | 8 |
| Approx. Temp. | 140 °C | 160 °C | 180 °C | 200 °C | 220 °C | 240 °C | 260 °C | 280 °C |

Other ovens may be marked on a scale of 1–7, where Stufe 1/2 is about 125 °C in a conventional oven, Stufe 1 is about 150 °C, increasing by 25 °C for each subsequent step, up to Stufe 7 at 300 °C.

== See also ==
- Outline of metrology and measurement
