= Rømer scale =

Scale of temperature

Rømer temperature conversion formulae
	from Rømer	to Rømer
Celsius	x °Rø ≘ (x − 7.5) × 40/21 °C	x °C ≘ (x × 21/40 + 7.5) °Rø
Fahrenheit	x °Rø ≘ ((x − 7.5) × 24/7 + 32) °F	x °F ≘ ((x − 32) × 7/24 + 7.5) °Rø
Kelvin	x °Rø ≘ ((x − 7.5) × 40/21 + 273.15) K	x K ≘ ((x − 273.15) × 21/40 + 7.5) °Rø
Rankine	x °Rø ≘ ((x − 7.5) × 24/7 + 491.67) °R	x °R ≘ ((x − 491.67) × 7/24 + 7.5) °Rø
For temperature intervals rather than specific temperatures, 1 °Rø = 40/21 °C = 24/7 °F; Conversion between temperature scales

The Rømer scale (Danish pronunciation: [ˈʁœˀmɐ]; notated as °Rø), also known as Romer or Roemer, is a temperature scale named after the Danish astronomer Ole Christensen Rømer, who developed it for his own use in around 1702. It is based on the freezing point of pure water being 7.5 degrees and the boiling point of water as 60 degrees. It is the second scale of temperature registered in history, after the Newton scale devised by Isaac Newton one year earlier.

== Degree measurements ==
There is no solid evidence as to why Rømer assigned the value of 7.5 degrees to water's freezing point. One proposed explanation is that Rømer initially intended the 0-degree point of his scale to correspond to the eutectic temperature of ammonium chloride brine, which was the coldest, easily reproducible temperature at the time and had already been used as the lower fiducial point for multiple temperature scales. The boiling point of water was defined as 60 degrees. Rømer then saw that the freezing point of pure water was roughly one eighth of the way (about 7.5 degrees) between these two points, so he redefined the lower fixed point to be the freezing point of water at precisely 7.5 degrees. This did not greatly change the scale but made it easier to calibrate by defining it by reference to pure water. Thus the unit of this scale, a Rømer degree, is $100 \div 52.5 = \frac{40}{21}$ of a kelvin or Celsius degree. The symbol is sometimes given as °R, but since that is also sometimes used for the Réaumur and Rankine scales, the other symbol °Rø is to be preferred.

== Historical significance ==
Rømer's scale would have been lost to history if Rømer's notebook, Adverseria, were not found and published in 1910 and letters of correspondence between Daniel Gabriel Fahrenheit and Herman Boerhaave were not uncovered in 1936. These documents demonstrate the important influence Rømer's work had on Fahrenheit, a young maker and seller of barometers and thermometers.

Fahrenheit visited Rømer in Copenhagen in 1708 and while there, became familiar with Rømer's work with thermometers. Rømer also told Fahrenheit that demand for accurate thermometers was high. The visit ignited a keen interest in Fahrenheit to try to improve thermometers.

By 1713, Fahrenheit was creating his own thermometers with a scale heavily borrowed from Rømer that ranged from 0 to 24 degrees but with each degree divided into quarters. At some point, the quarter degrees became whole degrees and Fahrenheit made other adjustments to Rømer's scale, modifying the freezing point from 7.5 degrees to 8, which, when multiplied by four, correlates to 32 degrees on Fahrenheit's scale The 22.5 degree point would have become 90 degrees, but Fahrenheit rounded this up to 24 degrees – 96 when multiplied by 4 – in order to make calculations easier.

After Fahrenheit perfected the crafting of his accurate thermometers, their use became widespread and the Fahrenheit scale is still used today in the United States and a handful of other countries.

== See also ==
- Outline of metrology and measurement
- Comparison of temperature scales
