= Newton scale =

Scale of temperature

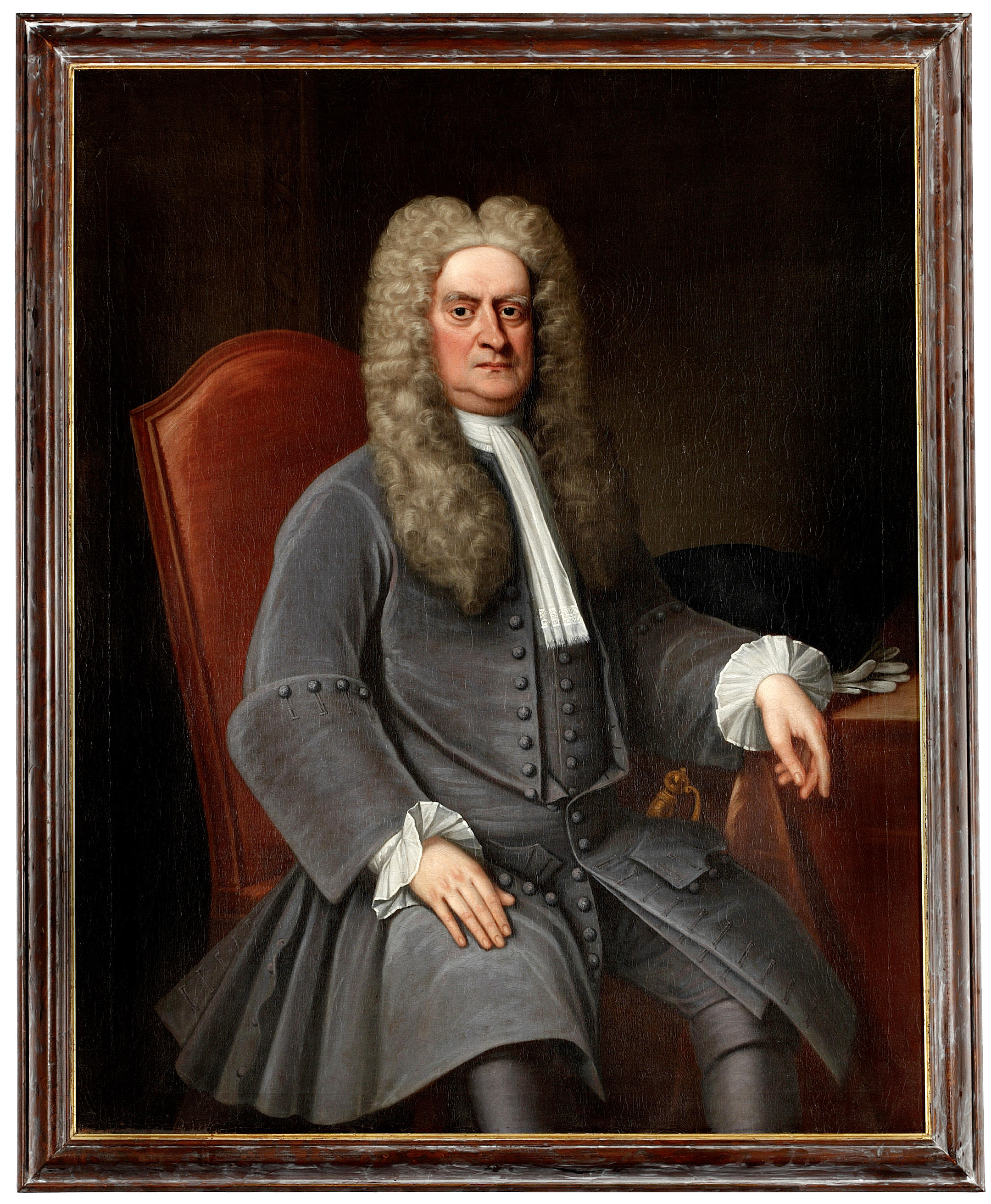
Sir Isaac Newton, inventor of the Newton scale

The Newton scale is a temperature scale devised by Isaac Newton in 1701. He called his device a "thermometer", but he did not use the term "temperature", speaking of "degrees of heat" (gradus caloris) instead. Newton's publication represents the first attempt to introduce an objective way of measuring (what would come to be called) temperature (alongside the Rømer scale published at nearly the same time). With Newton using melting points of alloys of various metals such as bismuth, lead and tin, he was the first to employ melting or freezing points of metals for a temperature scale. He also contemplated the idea of absolute zero. Newton likely developed his scale for practical use rather than for a theoretical interest in thermodynamics; he had been appointed Warden of the Mint in 1695, and Master of the Mint in 1699, and his interest in the melting points of metals was likely inspired by his duties in connection with the Royal Mint.

Newton used linseed oil as thermometric material and measured its change of volume against his reference points. He set as 0 on his scale "the heat of air in winter at which water begins to freeze" (Calor aeris hyberni ubi aqua incipit gelu rigescere), reminiscent of the standard of the modern Celsius scale (i.e. 0 °N = 0 °C), but he has no single second reference point. While he does give the "heat at which water begins to boil" as 33, this is not a defining reference. The values for body temperature and the freezing and boiling point of water suggest a conversion factor between the Newton and the Celsius scale of between about 3.08 (12 °N = 37 °C) and 3.03 (33 °N = 100 °C), but since the objectively verifiable reference points given result in irreconcilable data (especially for high temperatures), no unambiguous "conversion" between the scales is possible.

The linseed thermometer could be used up to the melting point of tin. For higher temperatures, Newton used a "sufficiently thick piece of iron" that was heated until red-hot and then exposed to the wind. On this piece of iron, samples of metals and alloys were placed, which melted and then again solidified on cooling. Newton then determined the "degrees of heat" of these samples based on the solidification times, and tied this scale to the linseed one by measuring the melting point of tin in both systems. This second system of measurement led Newton to derive his law of convective heat transfer, also known as Newton's law of cooling.

In his publication, Newton gives 18 reference points (in addition to a range of meteorological air temperatures), which he labels by two systems, one in arithmetic progression and the other in geometric progression, as follows:

Arithmetic	Geometric	Description
0		the heat of air in winter at which water begins to freeze. This point may be accurately determined by pressing the thermometer into melting snow.
0,1,2		the heats of air in winter
2,3,4		the heats of air in spring and autumn
4,5,6		the heat of air in summer
6		the heat at midday about the month of July
12	1	the greatest heat which a thermometer takes up when in contact with the human body
14	1 1/4	the greatest heat of a bath which one can endure for some time when the hand is dipped in and is kept in constant movement
17	1 1/2	the greatest heat of a bath which one can endure for some time when the hand is dipped in and is kept still
20		the heat of a bath in which liquid wax slowly becomes solid and assumes transparency
24	2	the heat of a bath in which solid wax melts and is conserved in liquid state without boiling
28	2 1/4	intermediate point between the boiling point of water and the melting point of wax
34		the heat at which water boils vehemently (the temperature at which water begins to boil is given as an additional value in the description, as 33)
40		melting point of an alloy of one part lead, four parts tin and five parts bismuth
48	3	melting point of an alloy of equal parts of bismuth and tin
57	3 1/4	melting point of an alloy of one part bismuth and two parts tin
68	3 1/2	melting point of an alloy of one part bismuth and eight parts tin
81		melting point of bismuth
96	4	melting point of lead
114	4 1/4	heat of bodies that can barely be seen glowing at night
136	4 1/2	heat of bodies that can be seen glowing by twilight
161		heat of bodies that can be seen glowing by daylight
192	5	heat of iron glowing as brightly as possible

== See also ==
- Outline of metrology and measurement
- Comparison of temperature scales
- List of obsolete units of measurement
