= Réaumur scale =

Scale of temperature

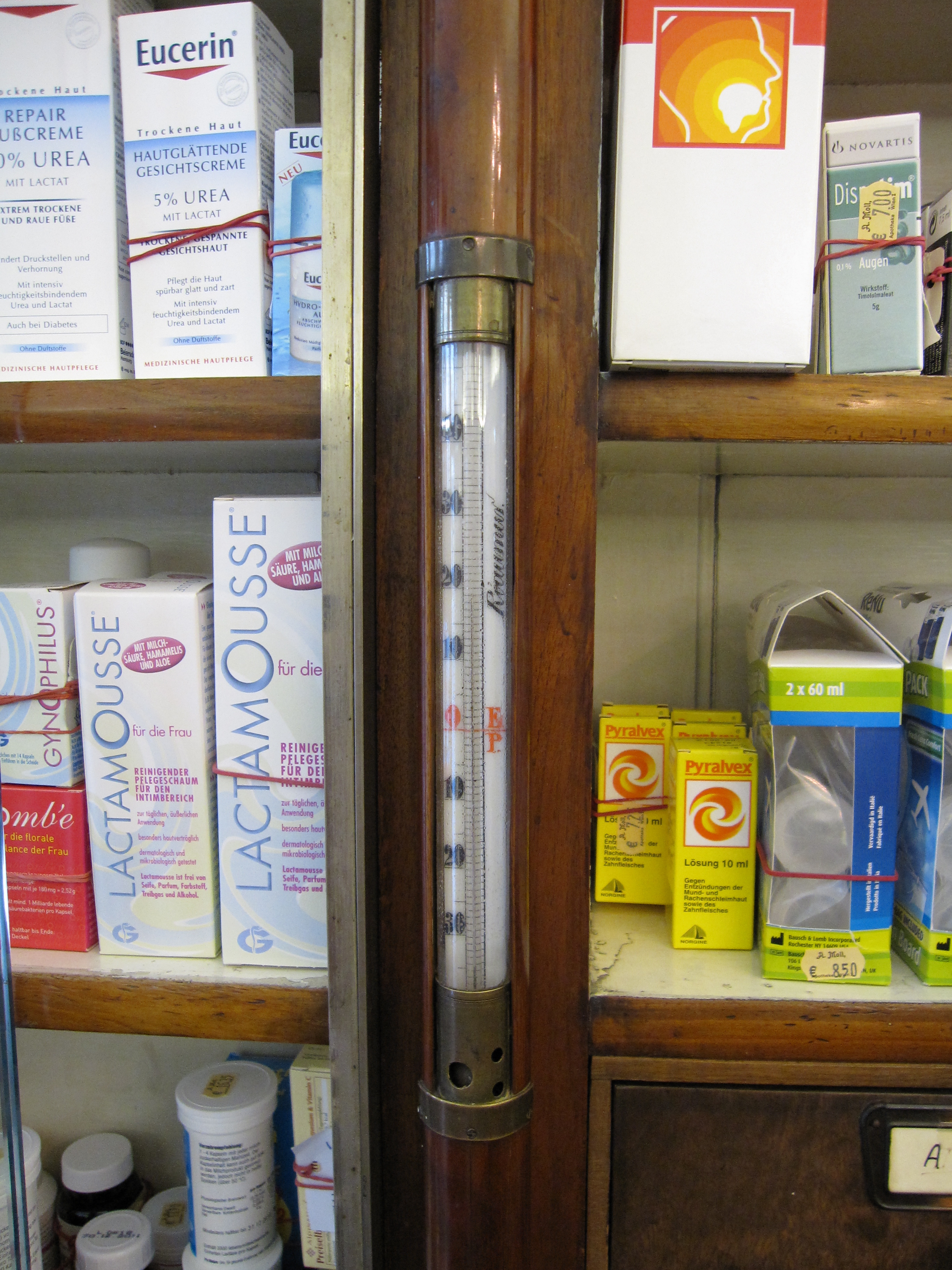
Old thermometer in a pharmacy in Vienna, showing room temperature by Réaumur scale.

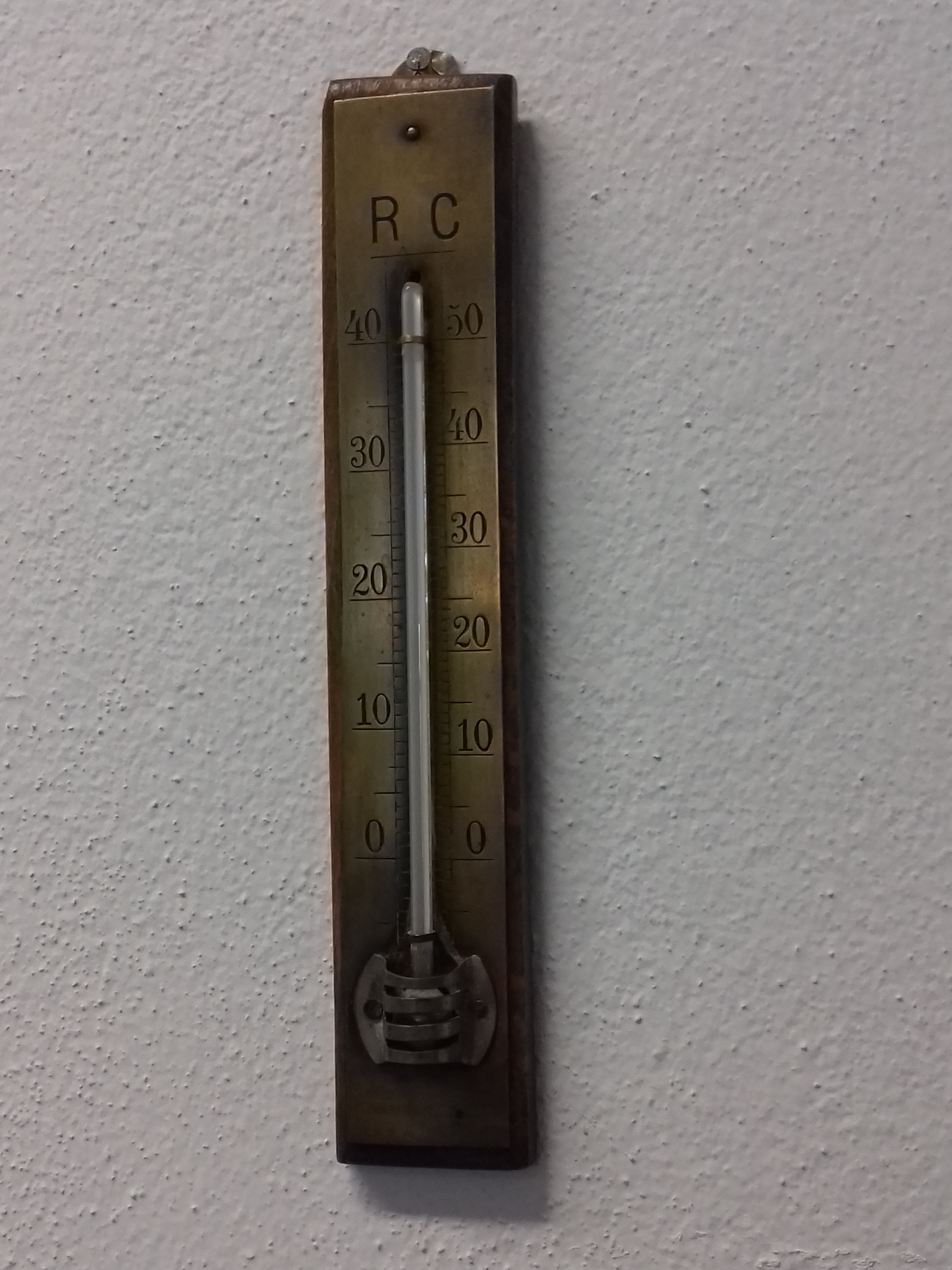
Réaumur and Celsius scale on thermometer. Private collection, central Europe.

The Réaumur scale (French pronunciation: [ʁeomy(ː)ʁ]; °Ré, °Re, °r), also known as the "octogesimal division", is a temperature scale for which the freezing point and boiling points of water are defined as 0 and 80 degrees respectively. The scale is named for René Antoine Ferchault de Réaumur, who first proposed a similar scale in 1730.

== Change in scale ==
Réaumur's thermometer contained diluted alcohol (ethanol) and was constructed on the principle of using 0° for the melting temperature of water, and graduating the tube into degrees, each of which was one -thousandth of the volume contained by the bulb and tube up to the zero mark. He suggested that the concentration of alcohol employed be such that it began boiling at 80 °Ré – that is, when it had expanded in volume by 8%. He chose alcohol instead of mercury because it expands more visibly, but this posed problems: his original thermometers were very bulky, and the low boiling point of alcohol made them unsuitable for many applications. Instrument-makers generally chose different liquids, and then used 80 °Ré to signify the boiling point of water, causing much confusion.

During 1772 Jean-André Deluc studied the several substances then used in thermometers and concluded that mercury thermometers were the best for practical use, on the grounds that among these substances its volume varies the most linearly with the method of mixtures. In detail, if two portions of water of equal masses A, B were mixed, and let the resulting water be C, and if we immerse a thermometer in A, B, C, we obtain lengths $l_A, l_B, l_C$. Deluc expected that $l_C = \frac 12 (l_A + l_B)$, and similarly for other ratios of mixtures. He found that thermometers made using mercury allowed the closest fit to his expectation of linearity.

From the late 18th century, mercury was used almost without exception.

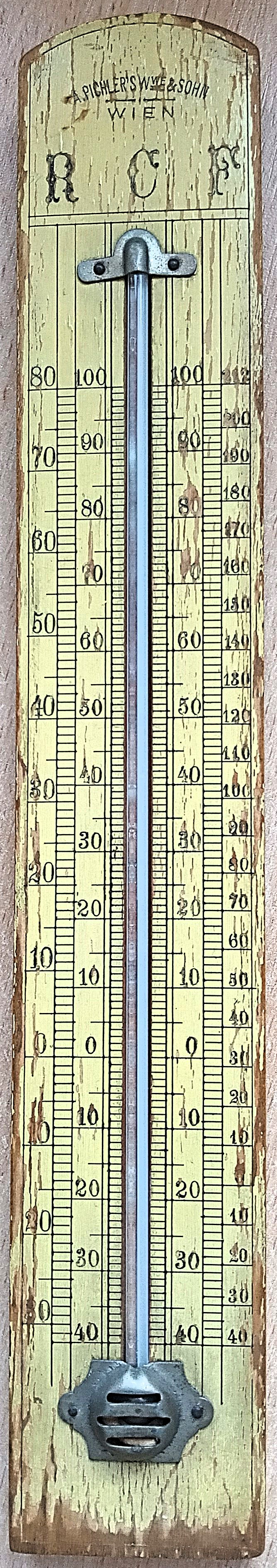
A three-scale thermometer manufactured by Pichlers Witwe and Sohn in Vienna

== Use ==
The Réaumur scale was used widely in Europe, particularly in France, Germany and Russia, and was referenced in the works of Thomas Jefferson, Thomas Mann, Fyodor Dostoevsky, Gustave Flaubert, James Joyce, Leo Tolstoy, Honoré de Balzac and Vladimir Nabokov. For example, in Query VII of Notes on the State of Virginia, Jefferson converts readings from the Fahrenheit thermometer at Williamsburg to the Réaumur scale. At the beginning of Book X of The Brothers Karamazov, the narrator says, "We had eleven degrees of frost", i.e. −11 °Ré, equivalent to −14 °C or 7 °F. By the 1790s, France had chosen the centigrade scale as part of the metric system, rather than the Réaumur measurement, but the Réaumur scale continued to be used in some parts of Europe until at least the mid-19th century, and in parts of Russia until the early 20th. Its main modern uses are in some Italian and Swiss factories for measuring milk temperature during cheese production, and in the Netherlands for measuring temperature when cooking sugar syrup for desserts and sweets.

Uses outside of Europe include a Mexican colonel in Santa Anna's army in San Antonio, Texas, in 1836 recording the night's temperature as 34 °F and 1 °Ré.

== Conversion between different temperature units ==
Réaumur temperature conversion formulae
	from Réaumur	to Réaumur
Celsius	x °Ré ≘ x × 5/4 °C	x °C ≘ x × 4/5 °Ré
Fahrenheit	x °Ré ≘ (x × 9/4 + 32) °F	x °F ≘ (x − 32) × 4/9 °Ré
Kelvin	x °Ré ≘ (x × 5/4 + 273.15) K	x K ≘ (x − 273.15) × 4/5 °Ré
Rankine	x °Ré ≘ (x × 9/4 + 491.67) °R	x °R ≘ (x − 491.67) × 4/9 °Ré
For temperature intervals rather than specific temperatures, 1 °Ré = 1.25 °C = 2.25 °F; Conversion between temperature scales

== See also ==
- Outline of metrology and measurement
