= Rankine scale =

Absolute temperature scale using Fahrenheit degrees

Rankine
- Unit of: Temperature
- Symbol: °R, °Ra
- Named after: W. J. M. Rankine

Conversions
491.67 °R in ...	... corresponds to ...
- Kelvin: 273.15 K
- Celsius: 0 °C
- Fahrenheit: 32 °F

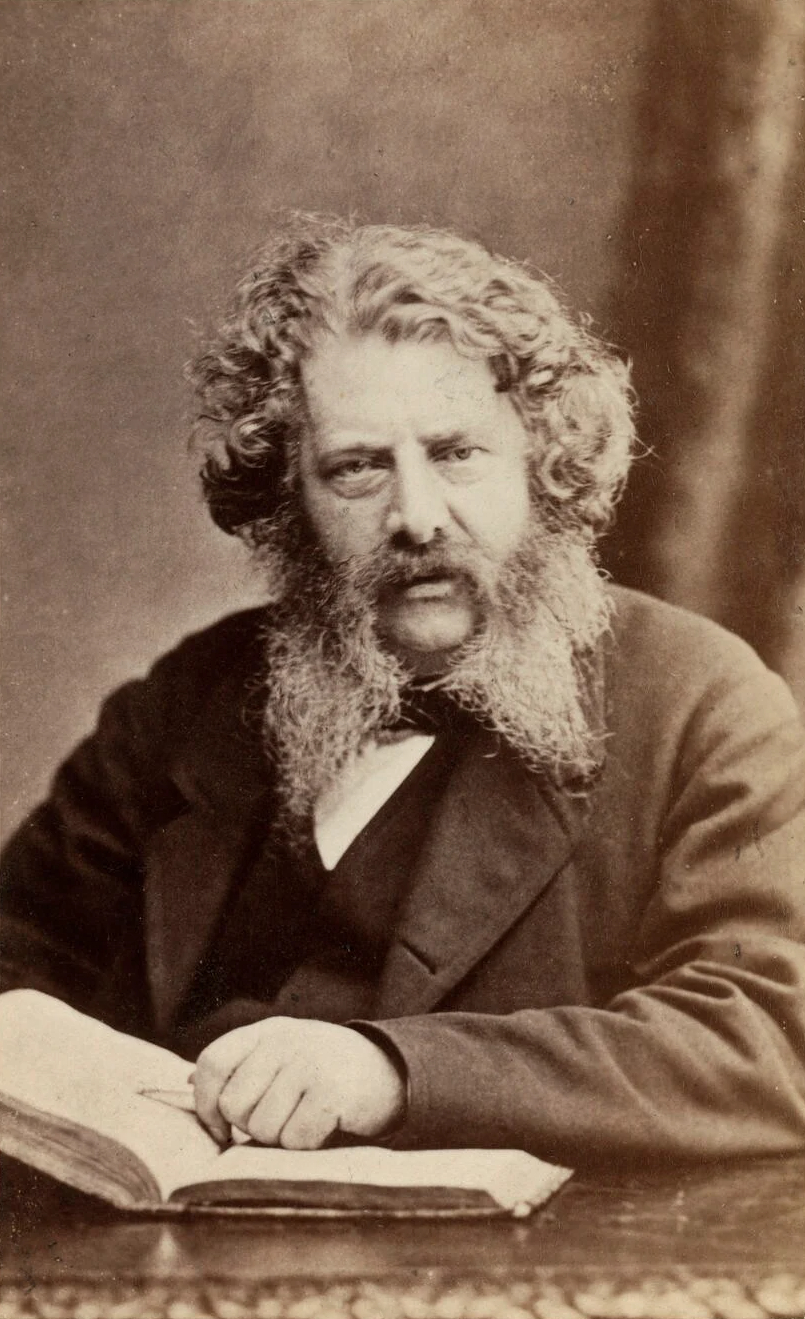
W.J. Rankine

The Rankine scale (/ˈræŋkɪn/ RANG-kin) is an absolute scale of thermodynamic temperature named after the University of Glasgow engineer and physicist W. J. M. Rankine, who proposed it in 1859. As on the Kelvin scale, which was first proposed in 1848, zero on the Rankine scale is absolute zero, but a temperature difference of one Rankine degree (°R or °Ra) is defined as equal to one Fahrenheit degree, rather than the Celsius degree used on the Kelvin scale. In converting from kelvin to degrees Rankine, 1 °R = 5/9 K or 1 K = 1.8 °R. A temperature of 0 K (−273.15 °C; −459.67 °F) is equal to 0 °R.

== Usage ==
The Rankine scale is used in engineering systems where heat computations are done using degrees Fahrenheit.

The symbol for degrees Rankine is °R (or °Ra if necessary to distinguish it from the Rømer and Réaumur scales). By analogy with the SI unit kelvin, some authors term the unit Rankine, omitting the degree symbol.

Some temperatures relating the Rankine scale to other temperature scales are shown in the table below.

		Scale				
		Kelvin	Rankine	Fahrenheit	Celsius	Réaumur
Temperature	Absolute zero	0 K	0.00 °R	−459.67 °F	−273.15 °C	−218.52 °Ré
Temperature	Freezing point of brine (Note: The freezing point of brine is the zero point of Fahrenheit scale, old definition.)	255.37 K	459.67 °R	0.00 °F	−17.78 °C	−14.22 °Ré
Temperature	Freezing point of water (Note: The ice point of purified water has been measured to be 0.0000891̅0̅ degrees Celsius.)	273.15 K	491.67 °R	32.00 °F	0.00 °C	0 °Ré
Temperature	Boiling point of water (Note: For Vienna Standard Mean Ocean Water at one standard atmosphere (101.325 kPa) when calibrated solely per the two-point definition of thermodynamic temperature. Older definitions of the Celsius scale once defined the boiling point of water under one standard atmosphere as being precisely 100 °C. However, the current definition results in a boiling point that is actually 16.1 mK less. For more about the actual boiling point of water, see VSMOW in temperature measurement.)	373.1339 K	671.641 °R	211.971 °F	99.9839 °C	79.9871 °Ré

== See also ==
- Outline of metrology and measurement
- Comparison of temperature scales
