= Fahrenheit =

Temperature scale

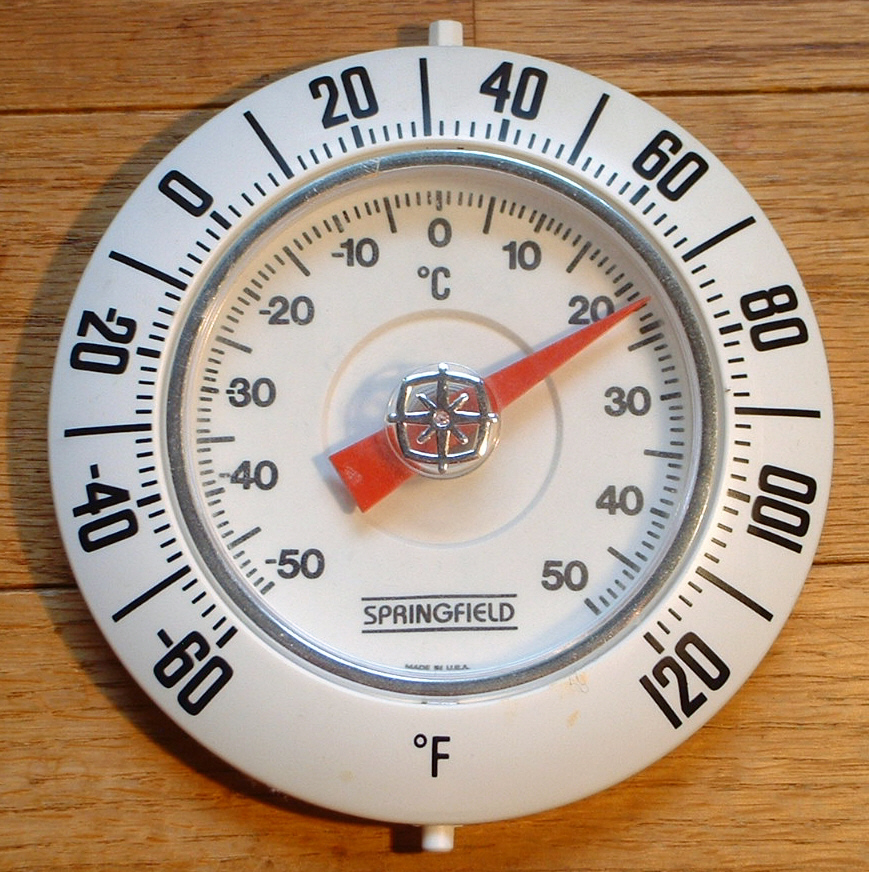
- Thermometer with Fahrenheit (marked on outer bezel) and Celsius (marked on inner dial) degree units

General information
- Unit system: Imperial/US customary
- Unit of: Temperature
- Symbol: °F
- Named after: Daniel Gabriel Fahrenheit

Conversions
x °F in ...	... corresponds to ...
- Kelvin: 5/9(x + 459.67) K
- Celsius: 5/9(x − 32) °C
- Rankine scale: x + 459.67 °Ra

The Fahrenheit scale (/ˈfærənhaɪt, ˈfɑːr-/) is a temperature scale based on one proposed in 1724 by Daniel Gabriel Fahrenheit (1686–1736). It uses the degree Fahrenheit (symbol: °F) as the unit. Several accounts of how he originally defined his scale exist, but the original paper suggests the lower defining point, 0 °F, was established as the freezing temperature of a solution of brine made from a mixture of water, ice, and ammonium chloride (a salt). The other limit established was his best estimate of the average human body temperature, originally set at 90 °F, then 96 °F (about 2.6 °F less than the modern value because the scale was later redefined).

For much of the 20th century, the Fahrenheit scale was defined by two fixed points with a 180 °F separation: the temperature at which pure water freezes was defined as 32 °F and the boiling point of water was defined to be 212 °F, both at sea level and under standard atmospheric pressure. It is now formally defined using the Kelvin scale.

It continues to be used in the United States (including its unincorporated territories), its freely associated states in the Western Pacific (Palau, the Federated States of Micronesia and the Marshall Islands), which all use the United States National Weather Service, and one British Overseas Territory—the Cayman Islands.

Fahrenheit is still used alongside the Celsius scale in other countries that use the U.S. meteorological service, such as Antigua and Barbuda, Saint Kitts and Nevis, the Bahamas, and Belize. A handful of British Overseas Territories, including the Virgin Islands, Montserrat, Anguilla, and Bermuda, also still use both scales. All other countries now use Celsius ("centigrade" until 1948), which was developed 18 years after the Fahrenheit scale.

== Definition and conversion ==
Fahrenheit temperature conversion formulae
	from Fahrenheit	to Fahrenheit
Celsius	x °F ≘ (x − 32) × 5/9 °C	x °C ≘ (x × 9/5 + 32) °F
Kelvin	x °F ≘ (x + 459.67) × 5/9 K	x K ≘ (x × 9/5 − 459.67) °F
Rankine	x °F ≘ (x + 459.67) °R	x °R ≘ (x − 459.67) °F
For temperature intervals rather than specific temperatures, 1 °F = 1 °R = 5/9 °C = 5/9 K Conversion between temperature scales

Historically, on the Fahrenheit scale the freezing point of water was 32 °F, and the boiling point was 212 °F (at standard atmospheric pressure). This put the boiling and freezing points of water 180 degrees apart. Therefore, a degree on the Fahrenheit scale was 1/180 of the interval between the freezing point and the boiling point. On the Celsius scale, the freezing and boiling points of water were originally defined to be 100 degrees apart. A temperature interval of 1 °F was equal to an interval of 5/9 degrees Celsius. With the Fahrenheit and Celsius scales now both defined by the kelvin, this relationship was preserved, a temperature interval of 1 °F being equal to an interval of 5/9 K and of 5/9 °C. The Fahrenheit and Celsius scales intersect numerically at −40 in the respective unit (i.e., −40 °F corresponds to −40 °C).

Absolute zero is 0 K, −273.15 °C, or −459.67 °F. The Rankine temperature scale uses degree intervals of the same size as those of the Fahrenheit scale, except that absolute zero is 0 °R – the same way that the Kelvin temperature scale matches the Celsius scale, except that absolute zero is 0 K.

The combination of degree symbol (°) followed by an uppercase letter F is the conventional symbol for the Fahrenheit temperature scale. A number followed by this symbol (and separated from it with a space) denotes a specific temperature point (e.g., "Gallium melts at 85.5763 °F"). A difference between temperatures or an uncertainty in temperature is also conventionally written the same way as well, e.g., "The output of the heat exchanger experiences an increase of 72 °F" or "Our standard uncertainty is ±5 °F". However, some authors instead use the notation "An increase of 50 F°" (reversing the symbol order) to indicate temperature differences. Similar conventions exist for the Celsius scale, see Celsius § Temperatures and intervals.

=== Conversion (specific temperature point) ===
For an exact conversion between degrees Fahrenheit and Celsius, and kelvins of a specific temperature point, the following formulae can be applied. Here, f is the value in degrees Fahrenheit, c the value in degrees Celsius, and k the value in kelvins:

- f °F to c °C: c = (f − 32)/1.8
- c °C to f °F: f = c × 1.8 + 32
- f °F to k K: k = (f + 459.67)/1.8
- k K to f °F: f = k × 1.8 − 459.67

There is also an exact conversion between Celsius and Fahrenheit scales making use of the correspondence −40 °F ≘ −40 °C. Again, f is the numeric value in degrees Fahrenheit, and c the numeric value in degrees Celsius:

- f °F to c °C: c = (f + 40)/1.8 − 40
- c °C to f °F: f = (c + 40) × 1.8 − 40

=== Conversion (temperature difference or interval) ===
When converting a temperature interval between the Fahrenheit and Celsius scales, only the ratio is used, without any constant (in this case, the interval has the same numeric value in kelvins as in degrees Celsius):

- f °F to c °C or k K: c = k = f/1.8
- c °C or k K to f °F: f = c × 1.8 = k × 1.8

== History ==
Fahrenheit proposed his temperature scale in 1724, basing it on two reference points of temperature. In his initial scale (which is not the final Fahrenheit scale), the zero point was determined by placing the thermometer in "a mixture of ice, water, and salis Armoniaci (Note: "Sal Armoniac" was an impure form of ammonium chloride. The French chemist Nicolas Lémery (1645–1715) discussed it in his book Cours de Chymie (A Course of Chemistry, 1675), describing where it occurs naturally and how it can be prepared artificially. It occurs naturally in the deserts of northern Africa, where it forms from puddles of animal urine. It can be prepared artificially by boiling 5 parts of urine, 1 part of sea salt, and ½ part of chimney soot until the mixture has dried. The mixture is then heated in a sublimation pot until it sublimates; the sublimated crystals are sal Armoniac. See: Nicolas Lémery, Cours de chymie […], 7th ed. (Paris, France: Estienne Michallet, 1688), Chapitre XVII : du Sel Armoniac, pp. 338–339.; English translation: Nicolas Lémery with James Keill, trans., A Course of Chymistry […], 3rd ed. (London, England: Walter Kettilby, 1698), Chap. XVII: of Sal Armoniack, p. 383, available on-line at Heinrich Heine University (Düsseldorf, Germany).) [transl. ammonium chloride] or even sea salt". These combinations form a eutectic system (also known as a frigorific mixture in the context of temperature measurement), which stabilizes its temperature automatically: 0 °F was defined to be that stable temperature. We now know that ammonium chloride yields a temperature of about −15.5 °C (4 °F), whereas sodium chloride yields a temperature of about −22 °C (−8 °F), making this lowest point of the scale unlikely to have been reliably reproducible; Fahrenheit was presumably unaware they yielded different temperatures.

A second point, 32 degrees, was marked as being the temperature of ice and water "without the aforementioned salts". A third point, 96 degrees, was approximately the human body's temperature.

According to a German story, Fahrenheit actually chose the lowest air temperature measured in his hometown Danzig (now Gdańsk, Poland) in winter 1708–09 as 0 °F, and only later had the need to be able to make this value reproducible using brine.

According to a letter Fahrenheit wrote to his friend Herman Boerhaave, his scale was built on the work of Ole Rømer, whom he had met earlier. In Rømer scale, brine freezes at zero, water freezes and melts at 7.5 degrees, body temperature is 22.5, and water boils at 60 degrees. Fahrenheit multiplied each value by 4 in order to eliminate fractions and make the scale more fine-grained. He then re-calibrated his scale using the melting point of ice and normal human body temperature (which were at 30 and 90 degrees); he adjusted the scale so that the melting point of ice would be 32 degrees, and body temperature 96 degrees, so that 64 intervals would separate the two, allowing him to mark degree lines on his instruments by simply bisecting the interval 6 times (since 64 = 2^{6}).

Fahrenheit soon after observed that water boils at about 212 degrees using this scale. The use of the freezing and boiling points of water as thermometer fixed reference points became popular following the work of Anders Celsius, and these fixed points were adopted by a committee of the Royal Society led by Henry Cavendish in 1776–77. Under this system, the Fahrenheit scale is redefined slightly so that the freezing point of water was exactly 32 °F, and the boiling point was exactly 212 °F, or 180 degrees higher. It is for this reason that normal human body temperature is approximately 98.6 °F (oral temperature) on the revised scale (whereas it was 90° on Fahrenheit's multiplication of Rømer, and 96° on his original scale).

In the present-day Fahrenheit scale, 0 °F no longer corresponds to the eutectic temperature of ammonium chloride brine as described above. Instead, that eutectic is at approximately 4 °F on the final Fahrenheit scale. (Note: Eutectic temperature of ammonium chloride and water is listed as −15.9 °C (3.38 °F) and as −15.4 °C (4.28 °F) in (respectively): Peppin, S. S.; Huppert, H. E.; Worster, M. G. (2008). "Steady-state solidification of aqueous ammonium chloride" (PDF). J. Fluid Mech. 159. Cambridge University Press: 472 (table 1). Bibcode:2008JFM...599..465P. doi:10.1017/S0022112008000219. S2CID 30271164. Archived (PDF) from the original on 19 January 2010.; Barman, N.; Nayak, A. K.; Chattopadhyay, H. (2021). "Solidification of a Binary Solution (NH_{4}Cl + H_{2}O) on an Inclined Cooling Plate: A Parametric Study" (PDF). Procedia Materials Science. 7: 456 (table 1). doi:10.1016/j.mspro.2014.07.288. Archived (PDF) from the original on 15 January 2019.)

The Rankine temperature scale was based upon the Fahrenheit temperature scale, with its zero representing absolute zero instead.

== Usage ==
=== General ===
Countries by usage: Fahrenheit (°F) Fahrenheit (°F) and Celsius (°C) Celsius (°C)

The Fahrenheit scale was the primary temperature standard for climatic, industrial and medical purposes in Anglophone countries until the 1960s. In the late 1960s and 1970s, the Celsius scale replaced Fahrenheit in almost all of those countries—with the notable exception of the United States.

Fahrenheit is used in the United States, its territories and associated states (all serviced by the U.S. National Weather Service), as well as the (British) Cayman Islands for everyday applications. The Fahrenheit scale is in use in U.S. for all temperature measurements including weather forecasts, cooking, and food freezing temperatures; however, for scientific research, the scale is Celsius and Kelvin.

=== United States ===
Early in the 20th century, Halsey and Dale suggested that reasons for resistance to the use of the centigrade (now Celsius) system in the U.S. included the larger size of each degree Celsius and the lower zero point in the Fahrenheit system; and claimed the Fahrenheit scale is more intuitive than Celsius for describing outdoor temperatures in temperate latitudes, with 100 °F being a hot summer day and 0 °F a cold winter day.

=== Canada ===
Canada has passed legislation favoring the International System of Units, while also maintaining legal definitions for traditional Canadian imperial units. Canadian weather reports are conveyed using degrees Celsius with occasional reference to Fahrenheit especially for cross-border broadcasts. Fahrenheit is still used on virtually all Canadian ovens. Thermometers, both digital and analog, sold in Canada usually employ both the Celsius and Fahrenheit scales.

=== European Union ===
In the European Union, it is mandatory to use Kelvins or degrees Celsius when quoting temperature for "economic, public health, public safety and administrative" purposes, though degrees Fahrenheit may be used alongside degrees Celsius as a supplementary unit.

=== United Kingdom ===
Most British people use Celsius. However, the use of Fahrenheit still may appear at times alongside degrees Celsius in the print media with no standard convention for when the measurement is included.

For example, The Times has an all-metric daily weather page but includes a Celsius-to-Fahrenheit conversion table. Some UK tabloids have adopted a tendency of using Fahrenheit for mid to high temperatures. It has been suggested that the rationale to keep using Fahrenheit was one of emphasis, especially for high (weather) temperatures: "−6 °C" sounds colder than "21 °F", and "94 °F" sounds more sensational than "34 °C".

== Unicode representation of symbol ==
Unicode provides the Fahrenheit symbol at code point U+2109 ℉ DEGREE FAHRENHEIT. However, this is a compatibility character encoded for roundtrip compatibility with legacy encodings. The Unicode standard explicitly discourages the use of this character: "The sequence U+00B0 ° DEGREE SIGN + U+0046 F LATIN CAPITAL LETTER F is preferred over U+2109 ℉ DEGREE FAHRENHEIT, and those two sequences should be treated as identical for searching."

== See also ==
- Comparison of temperature scales
- Degree of frost
- Metrication
- Outline of metrology and measurement
