= List of measuring instruments =

Device for measuring a physical quantity

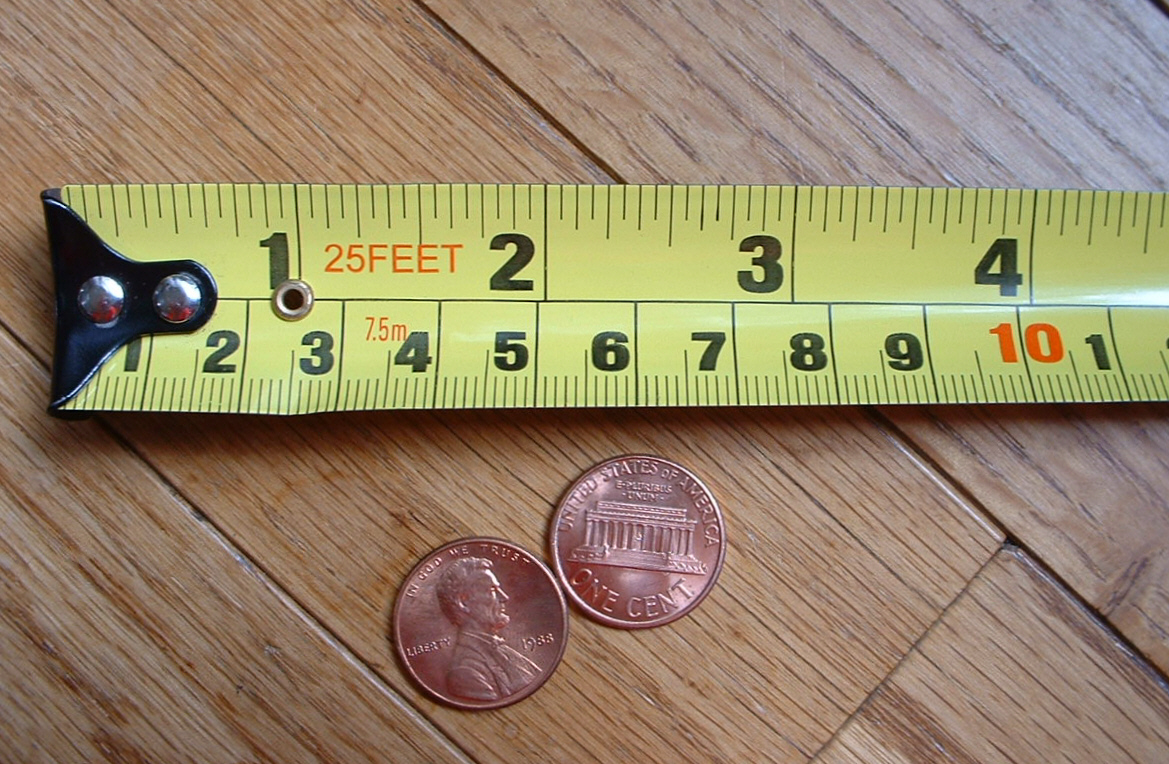
A measuring instrument for lengths: a typical tape measure with both metric and imperial units and two US pennies for comparison

A measuring instrument is a device to measure a physical quantity. In the physical sciences, quality assurance, and engineering, measurement is the activity of obtaining and comparing physical quantities of real-world objects and events. Established standard objects and events are used as units, and the process of measurement gives a number relating the item under study and the referenced unit of measurement. Measuring instruments, and formal test methods which define the instrument's use, are the means by which these relations of numbers are obtained. All measuring instruments are subject to varying degrees of instrument error and measurement uncertainty. These instruments may range from simple objects such as rulers and stopwatches to electron microscopes and particle accelerators. Virtual instrumentation is widely used in the development of modern measuring instruments.

== Time ==
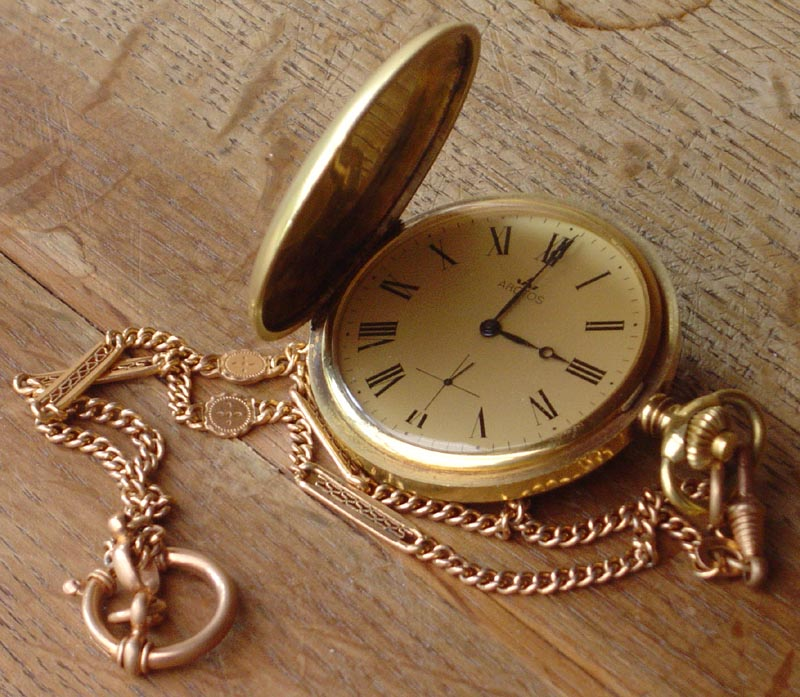
Watch, a time measurement device

In the past, common time measuring instrument were sundials, water clocks and hourglasses, measuring periods of time within a day. Today, the usual measuring instruments for time are clocks and watches. For highly accurate measurement of time an atomic clock is used. Stopwatches are also used to measure time in some sports.

== Energy ==
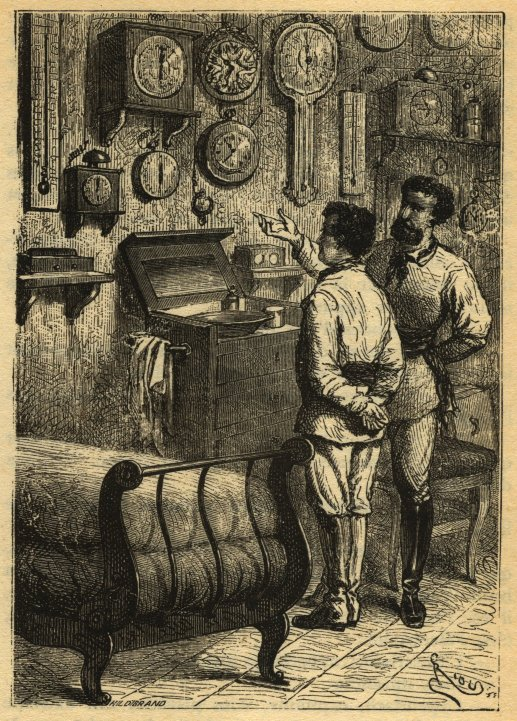
Measuring instruments in fiction: Captain Nemo and Professor Aronnax contemplating thermometers, barometers, clocks, etc. in Jules Verne's 1869-1870 science fiction novel Twenty Thousand Leagues Under the Seas

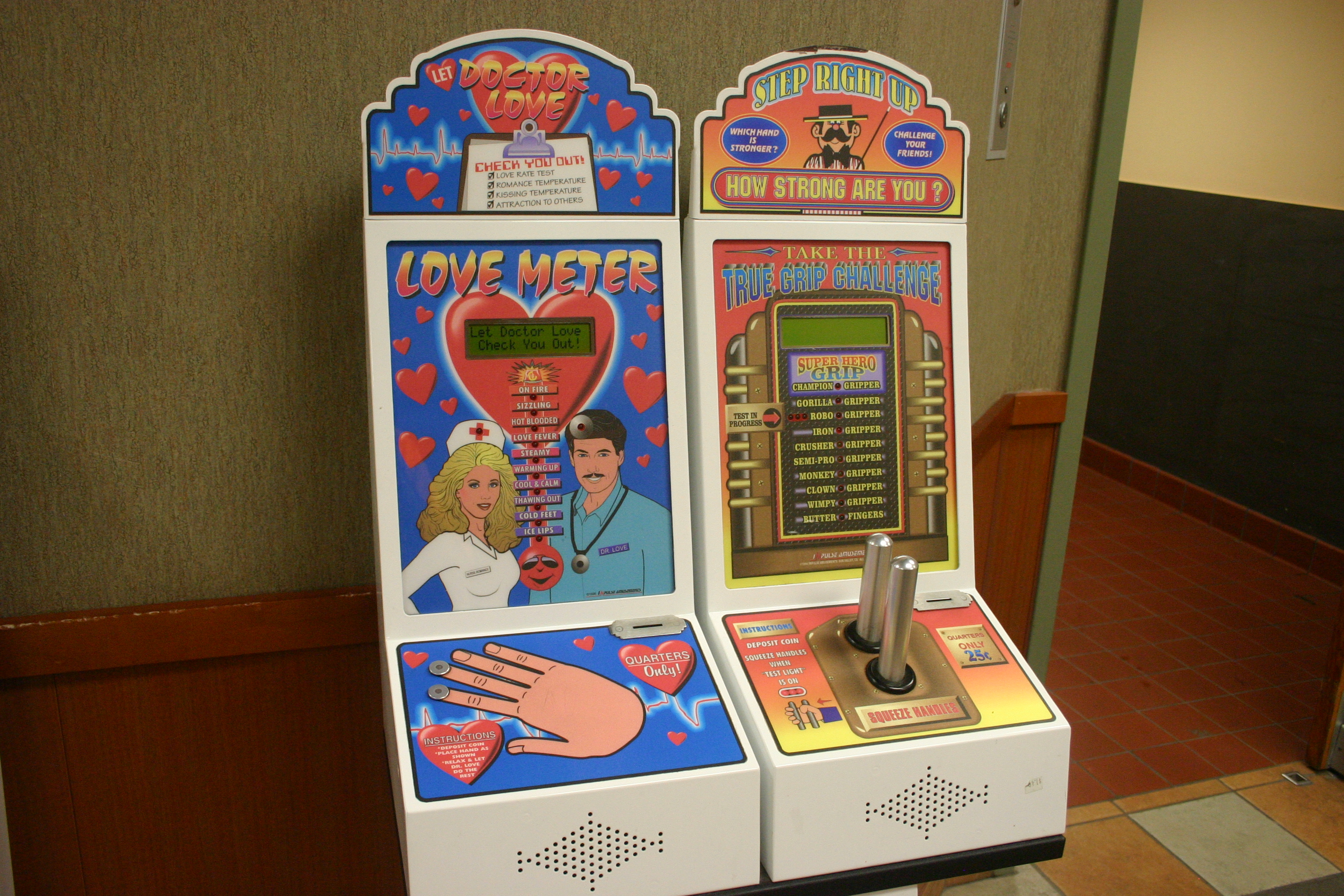
Fun measuring instruments: a Love Meter and strength tester machine at a Framingham, Massachusetts rest stop.

Energy is measured by an energy meter. Examples of energy meters include:

=== Electricity meter ===
An electricity meter measures energy directly in kilowatt-hours.

=== Gas meter ===
A gas meter measures energy indirectly by recording the volume of gas used. This figure can then be converted to a measure of energy by multiplying it by the calorific value of the gas.

== Power (flux of energy) ==
A physical system that exchanges energy may be described by the amount of energy exchanged per time-interval, also called power or flux of energy.

- (see any measurement device for power below)

For the ranges of power-values see: Orders of magnitude (power).

== Action ==
Action describes energy summed up over the time a process lasts (time integral over energy). Its dimension is the same as that of an angular momentum.

- A phototube provides a voltage measurement which permits the calculation of the quantized action (Planck constant) of light. (See also Photoelectric effect.)

== Geometry ==
=== Dimensions (size) ===
==== Length (distance) ====
- Length, distance, or range meter

For the ranges of length-values see: Orders of magnitude (length)

==== Area ====
- Planimeter

For the ranges of area-values see: Orders of magnitude (area)

==== Volume ====
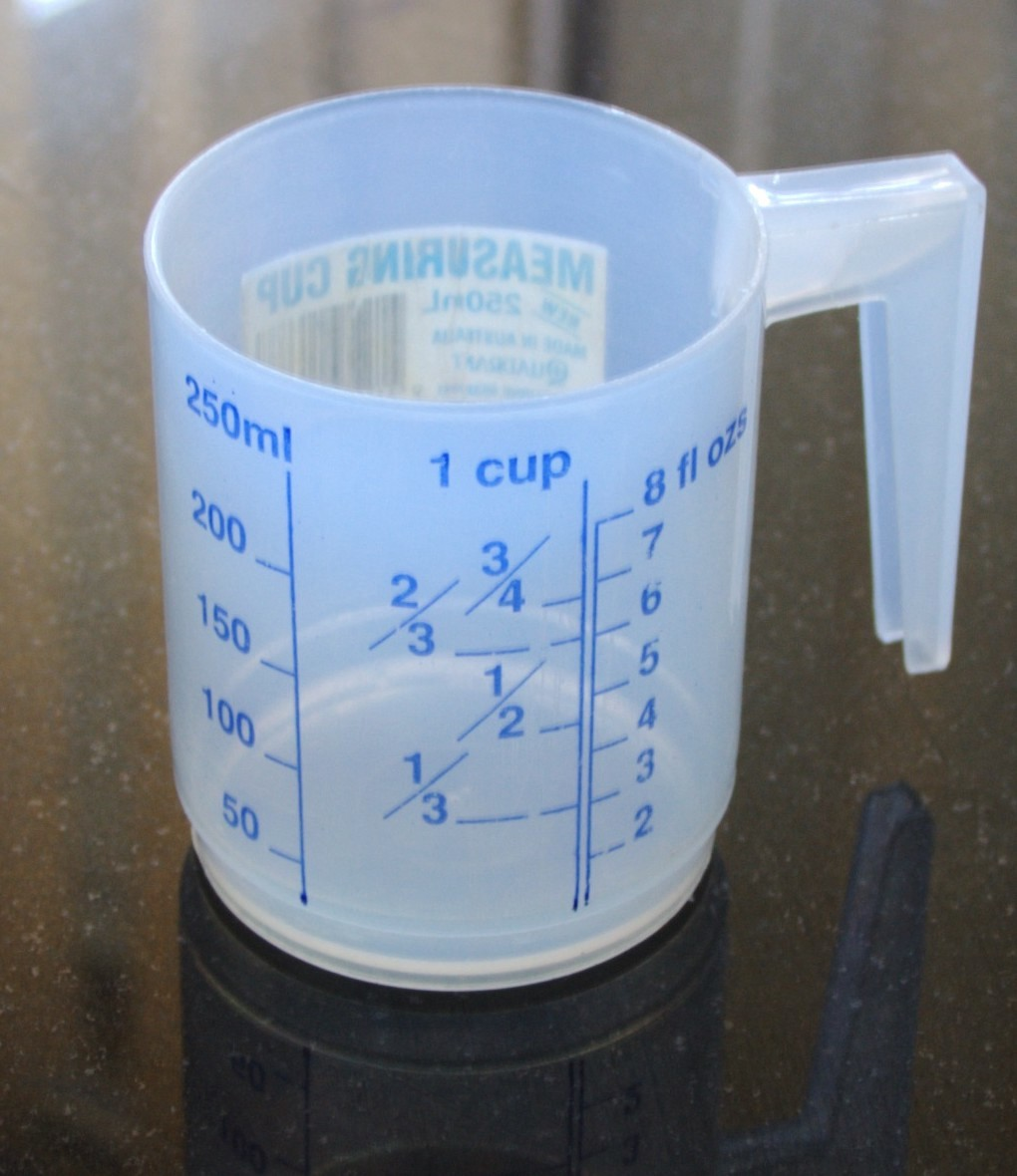
A measuring cup, a common instrument used to measure volume.

- Buoyant weight (solids)
- Eudiometer, pneumatic trough (gases)
- Flow measurement devices (liquids)
- Graduated cylinder (liquids)
- Measuring cup (grained solids, liquids)
- Overflow trough (solids)
- Pipette (liquids)

If the mass density of a solid is known, weighing allows to calculate the volume.

For the ranges of volume-values see: Orders of magnitude (volume)

=== Angle ===
- Circumferentor
- Cross staff
- Goniometer
- Graphometer
- Inclinometer
- Mural instrument
- Plurimeter
- Protractor
- Quadrant
- Reflecting instruments
  - Octant
  - Reflecting circles
  - Sextant
- Theodolite and total station

=== Orientation in three-dimensional space ===
See also the section about navigation below.

==== Level ====
- Level (instrument)
- Laser line level
- Spirit level

==== Direction ====
- Gyroscope

=== Coordinates ===
- Coordinate-measuring machine

== Mechanics ==
This includes basic quantities found in classical- and continuum mechanics; but strives to exclude temperature-related questions or quantities.

=== Mass or volume flow measurement ===
- Gas meter
- Mass flow meter
- Metering pump
- Water meter

=== Speed or velocity (flux of length) ===
- Airspeed indicator
- LIDAR speed gun
- Radar speed gun, a Doppler radar device, using the Doppler effect for indirect measurement of velocity.
- Speedometer
- Tachometer (speed of rotation)
- Tachymeter
- Variometer (rate of climb or descent)
- Velocimetry (measurement of fluid velocity)

For the ranges of speed-values see: Orders of magnitude (speed)

=== Acceleration ===
- Accelerometer

=== Mass ===
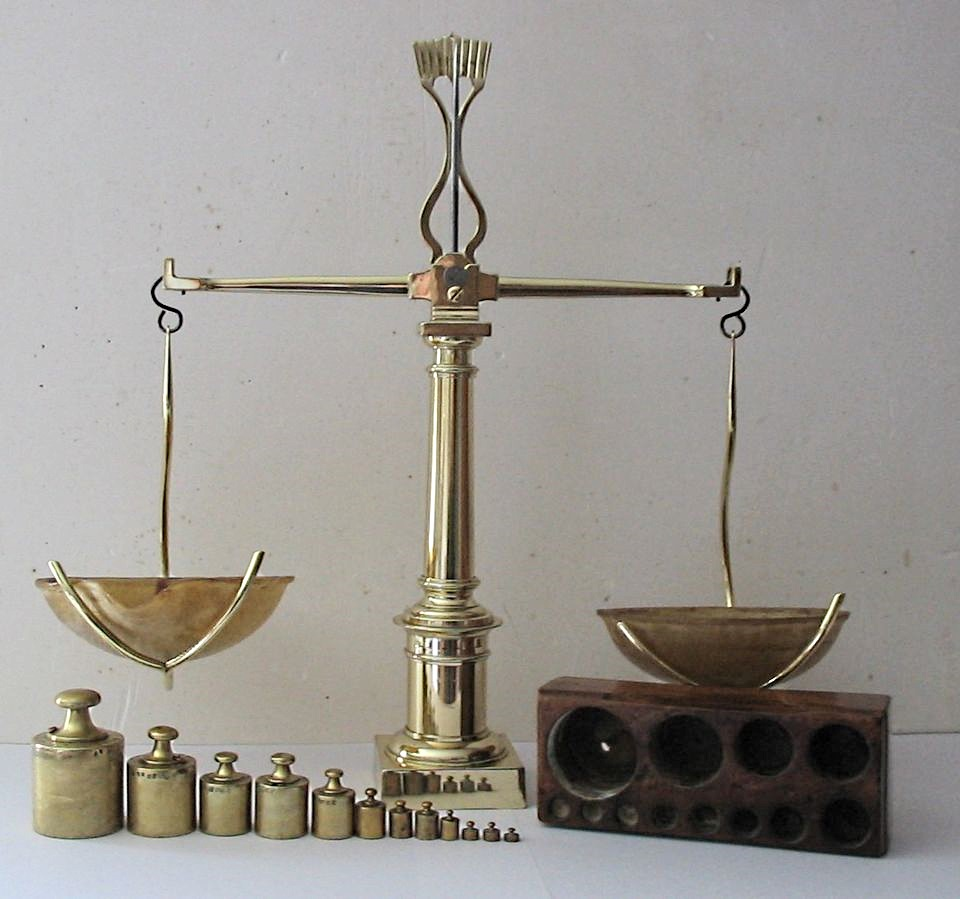
A pair of scales: An instrument for measuring mass in a force field by balancing forces.

- Balance
- Check weigher measures precise weight of items in a conveyor line, rejecting underweight or overweight objects.
- Inertial balance
- Katharometer
- Mass spectrometers measure the mass-to-charge ratio, not the mass, of ionised particles.
- Weighing scale

For the ranges of mass-values see: Orders of magnitude (mass)

=== Linear momentum ===
- Ballistic pendulum

=== Force (flux of linear momentum) ===
- Force gauge
- Spring scale
- Strain gauge
- Torsion balance
- Tribometer

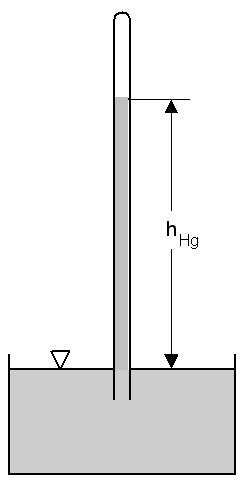
Measuring absolute pressure in an accelerated reference frame: The principle of a mercury (Hg) barometer in the gravitational field of the Earth.

=== Pressure (flux density of linear momentum) ===
- Anemometer (measures wind speed)
- Barometer used to measure the atmospheric pressure.
- Manometer (see Pressure measurement and Pressure sensor)
- Pitot tube (measures airspeed)
- Tire-pressure gauge in industry and mobility

For the ranges of pressure-values see: Orders of magnitude (pressure)

=== Angular velocity or rotations per time unit ===
- Stroboscope
- Tachometer

For the value-ranges of angular velocity see: Orders of magnitude (angular velocity)

For the ranges of frequency see: Orders of magnitude (frequency)

=== Torque ===
- Dynamometer
- Prony brake
- Torque wrench

=== Energy carried by mechanical quantities, mechanical work ===
- Ballistic pendulum, indirectly by calculation and or gauging

== Electricity, electronics, and electrical engineering ==
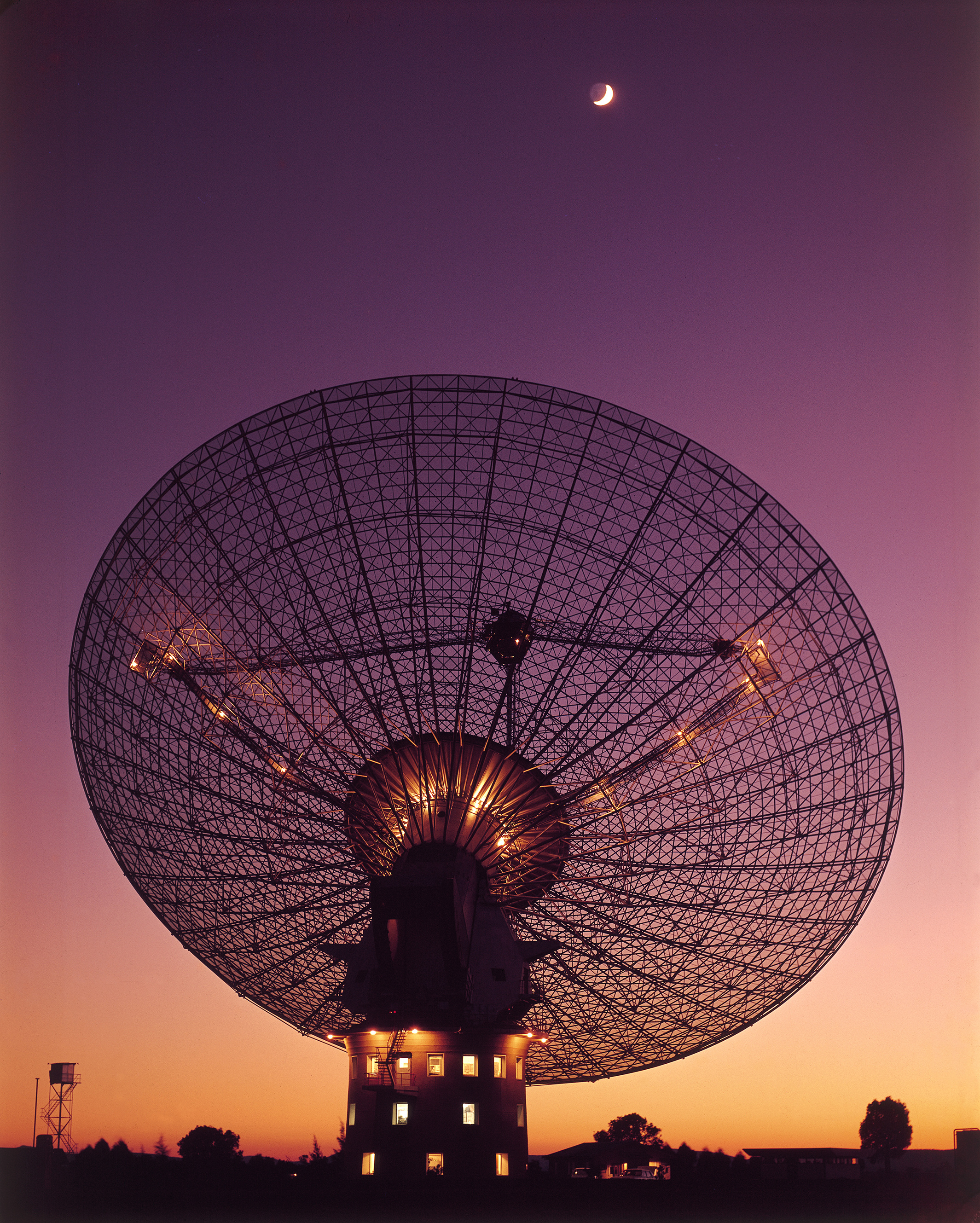
A measuring instrument for radio waves: the 64-meter radio telescope at Parkes Observatory, Australia, as seen in 1969, when it was used to receive live televised video from Apollo 11

Considerations related to electric charge dominate electricity and electronics. Electrical charges interact via a field. That field is called electric field.If the charge doesn't move. If the charge moves, thus realizing an electric current, especially in an electrically neutral conductor, that field is called magnetic. Electricity can be given a quality — a potential. And electricity has a substance-like property, the electric charge. Energy (or power) in elementary electrodynamics is calculated by multiplying the potential by the amount of charge (or current) found at that potential: potential times charge (or current). (See Classical electromagnetism and Covariant formulation of classical electromagnetism)

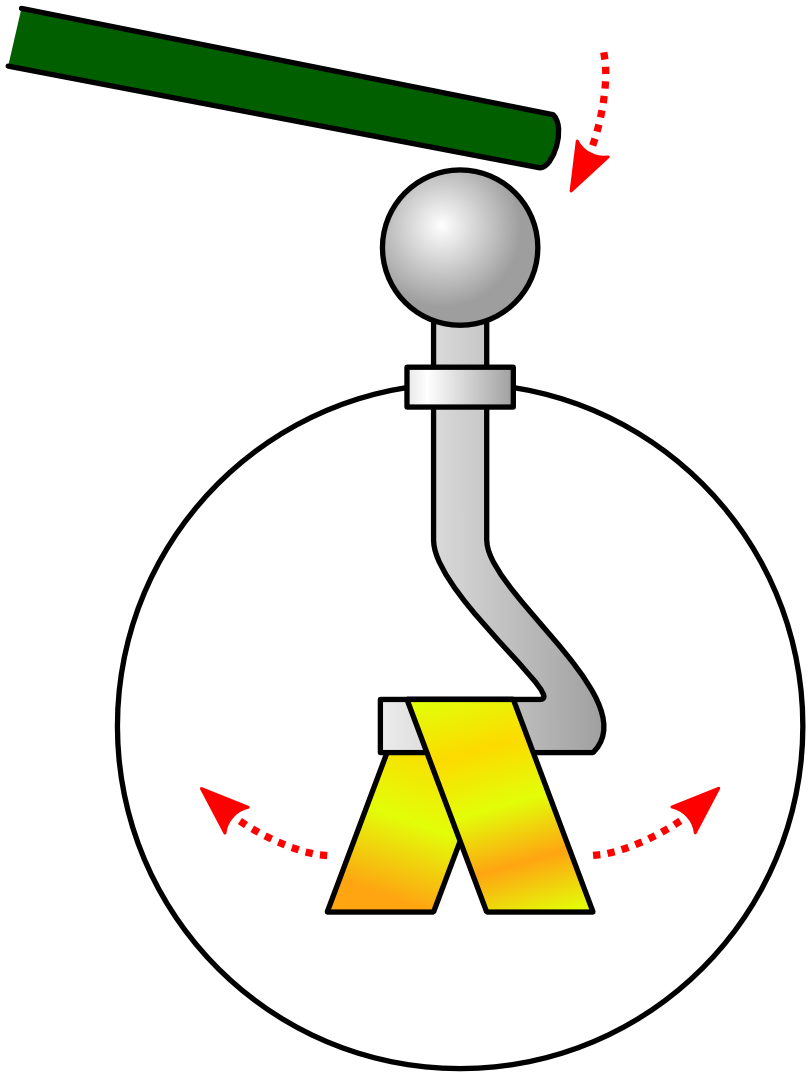
An instrument for detecting net charges, the electroscope.

=== Electric charge ===
- Electrometer is often used to reconfirm the phenomenon of contact electricity leading to triboelectric sequences.
- Torsion balance used by Coulomb to establish a relation between charges and force, see above.

For the ranges of charge values see: Orders of magnitude (charge)

=== Electric current (current of charge) ===
- Ammeter
- Clamp meter
- d'Arsonval galvanometer
- Galvanometer

=== Voltage (electric potential difference) ===
- Oscilloscope allows quantifying time-dependent voltages
- Voltmeter

=== Electric resistance, conductance, and conductivity ===
- Ohmmeter
- Time-domain reflectometer characterizes and locates faults in metallic cables by runtime measurements of electric signals.
- Wheatstone bridge

=== Electric capacitance ===
- Capacitance meter

=== Electric inductance ===
- Inductance meter

=== Energy carried by electricity or electric energy ===
- Electricity meter

=== Power carried by electricity (current of energy) ===
- Wattmeter

=== Electric field (negative gradient of electric potential, voltage per length) ===
- Field mill

=== Magnetic field ===
See also the relevant section in the article about the magnetic field.

- Compass
- Hall-effect sensor
- Magnetometer
- Proton magnetometer
- SQUID

For the ranges of magnetic field, see Orders of magnitude (magnetic field).

=== Combination instruments ===
- Multimeter, combines the functions of ammeter, voltmeter, and ohmmeter as a minimum.
- LCR meter, combines the functions of ohmmeter, capacitance meter, and inductance meter. Also called component bridge due to the bridge circuit method of measurement.

== Thermodynamics ==
Temperature-related considerations dominate thermodynamics. There are two distinct thermal properties: A thermal potential — the temperature. For example: A glowing coal has a different thermal quality than a non-glowing one.

And a substance-like property, — the entropy; for example: One glowing coal won't heat a pot of water, but a hundred will.

Energy in thermodynamics is calculated by multiplying the thermal potential by the amount of entropy found at that potential: temperature times entropy.

Entropy can be created by friction but not annihilated.

=== Amount of substance ===
A physical quantity introduced in chemistry; usually determined indirectly. If mass and substance type of the sample are known, then atomic- or molecular masses (taken from a periodic table, masses measured by mass spectrometry) give direct access to the value of the amount of substance. (See also Molar mass.) If specific molar values are given, then the amount of substance of a given sample may be determined by measuring volume, mass, or concentration. See also the subsection below about the measurement of the boiling point.

- Gas collecting tube gases

=== Temperature ===
- Electromagnetic spectroscopy
- Galileo thermometer
- Gas thermometer principle: relation between temperature and volume or pressure of a gas (gas laws).
  - Constant pressure gas thermometer
  - Constant volume gas thermometer
- Liquid crystal thermometer
- Liquid thermometer principle: relation between temperature and volume of a liquid (coefficient of thermal expansion).
  - Alcohol thermometer
  - Mercury-in-glass thermometer
- Pyranometer principle: solar radiation flux density relates to surface temperature (Stefan–Boltzmann law)
- Pyrometers principle: temperature dependence of spectral intensity of light (Planck's law), i.e. the color of the light relates to the temperature of its source, range: from about −50 °C to +4000 °C, note: measurement of thermal radiation (instead of thermal conduction, or thermal convection) means: no physical contact becomes necessary in temperature measurement (pyrometry). Also note: thermal space resolution (images) found in thermography.
- Resistance thermometer principle: relation between temperature and electrical resistance of metals (platinum) (electrical resistance), range: 10 to 1,000 kelvins, application in physics and industry
- Solid thermometer principle: relation between temperature and length of a solid (coefficient of thermal expansion).
  - Bimetallic strip
- Thermistors principle: relation between temperature and electrical resistance of ceramics or polymers, range: from about 0.01 to 2,000 kelvins (−273.14 to 1,700 °C)
- Thermocouples principle: relation between temperature and voltage of metal junctions (Seebeck effect), range: from about −200 °C to +1350 °C
- Thermometer
- Thermopile is a set of connected thermocouples
- Triple point cell used for calibrating thermometers.

==== Imaging technology ====
- Thermographic camera uses a microbolometer for detection of heat radiation.

See also Temperature measurement and Category:Thermometers. More technically related may be seen thermal analysis methods in materials science.

For the ranges of temperature-values see: Orders of magnitude (temperature)

=== Energy carried by entropy or thermal energy ===
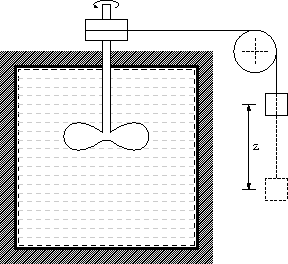
An active calorimeter lacking a temperature measurement device.

This includes thermal mass or temperature coefficient of energy, reaction energy, heat flow, ... Calorimeters are called passive if gauged to measure emerging energy carried by entropy, for example from chemical reactions. Calorimeters are called active or heated if they heat the sample, or reformulated: if they are gauged to fill the sample with a defined amount of entropy.

- Actinometer heating power of radiation.
- Constant-temperature calorimeter, phase change calorimeter for example an ice calorimeter or any other calorimeter observing a phase change or using a gauged phase change for heat measurement.
- Constant-volume calorimeter, also called bomb calorimeter
- Constant-pressure calorimeter, enthalpy-meter, or coffee cup calorimeter
- Differential Scanning Calorimeter
- Reaction calorimeter

See also Calorimeter or Calorimetry

=== Entropy ===
Entropy is accessible indirectly by measurement of energy and temperature.

==== Entropy transfer ====
Phase change calorimeter's energy value divided by absolute temperature give the entropy exchanged. Phase changes produce no entropy and therefore offer themselves as an entropy measurement concept. Thus entropy values occur indirectly by processing energy measurements at defined temperatures, without producing entropy.

- Constant-temperature calorimeter, phase change calorimeter
- Heat flux sensor uses thermopiles (which are connected thermocouples) to determine current density or flux of entropy.

==== Entropy content ====
The given sample is cooled down to (almost) absolute zero (for example by submerging the sample in liquid helium). At absolute zero temperature any sample is assumed to contain no entropy (see Third law of thermodynamics for further information). Then the following two active calorimeter types can be used to fill the sample with entropy until the desired temperature has been reached: (see also Thermodynamic databases for pure substances)

- Constant-pressure calorimeter, enthalpy-meter, active
- Constant-temperature calorimeter, phase change calorimeter, active

==== Entropy production ====
Processes transferring energy from a non-thermal carrier to heat as a carrier do produce entropy (Example: mechanical/electrical friction, established by Count Rumford). Either the produced entropy or heat are measured (calorimetry) or the transferred energy of the non-thermal carrier may be measured.

- calorimeter
- (any device for measuring the work which will or would eventually be converted to heat and the ambient temperature)

Entropy lowering its temperature—without losing energy—produces entropy (Example: Heat conduction in an isolated rod; "thermal friction").

- calorimeter

=== Temperature coefficient of energy or "heat capacity" ===
Concerning a given sample, a proportionality factor relating temperature change and energy carried by heat. If the sample is a gas, then this coefficient depends significantly on being measured at constant volume or at constant pressure. (The terminology preference in the heading indicates that the classical use of heat bars it from having substance-like properties.)

- Constant-volume calorimeter, bomb calorimeter
- Constant-pressure calorimeter, enthalpy-meter

=== Specific temperature coefficient of energy or "specific heat capacity" ===
The temperature coefficient of energy divided by a substance-like quantity (amount of substance, mass, volume) describing the sample. Usually calculated from measurements by a division or could be measured directly using a unit amount of that sample.

For the ranges of specific heat capacities see: Orders of magnitude (specific heat capacity)

=== Coefficient of thermal expansion ===
- Dilatometer
- Strain gauge

=== Melting temperature ===
- Differential Scanning Calorimeter gives melting point and enthalpy of fusion.
- Kofler bench
- Thiele tube

=== Boiling temperature ===
- Ebullioscope a device for measuring the boiling point of a liquid. This device is also part of a method that uses the effect of boiling point elevation for calculating the molecular mass of a solvent.

See also Thermal analysis, Heat.

== More on continuum mechanics ==
This includes mostly instruments which measure macroscopic properties of matter: In the fields of solid-state physics; in condensed matter physics which considers solids, liquids, and in-betweens exhibiting for example viscoelastic behavior; and furthermore, in fluid mechanics, where liquids, gases, plasmas, and in-betweens like supercritical fluids are studied.

=== Density ===
This refers to particle density of fluids and compact(ed) solids like crystals, in contrast to bulk density of grainy or porous solids.

- Aerometer liquids
- Dasymeter gases
- Gas collecting tube gases
- Hydrometer liquids
- Pycnometer liquids
- Resonant frequency and damping analyser (RFDA) solids

For the ranges of density-values see: Orders of magnitude (density)

=== Hardness ===
- Durometer

=== Shape and surface of a solid ===
- Holographic interferometer
- Laser produced speckle pattern analysed.
- Resonant frequency and damping analyser (RFDA)
- Tribometer

=== Deformation ===
- Strain gauge all below

==== Elasticity ====
- Resonant frequency and damping analyser (RFDA), using the impulse excitation technique: A small mechanical impulse causes the sample to vibrate. The vibration depends on elastic properties, density, geometry, and inner structures (lattice or fissures).

==== Plasticity ====
- Cam plastometer
- Plastometer

Measurement results (a) brittle (b) ductile with breaking point (c) ductile without breaking point.

==== Tensile strength, ductility, or malleability ====
- Universal testing machine

=== Granularity ===
- Grindometer

=== Viscosity ===
- Rheometer
- Viscometer

=== Optical activity ===
- Polarimeter

=== Surface tension ===
- Tensiometer

=== Imaging technology ===
- Tomograph, device and method for non-destructive analysis of multiple measurements done on a geometric object, for producing 2- or 3-dimensional images, representing the inner structure of that geometric object.
- Wind tunnel

This section and the following sections include instruments from the wide field of Category:Materials science, materials science.

== More on electric properties of condensed matter or gas ==
The electrochemical cell: A device for measuring substance potentials.

=== Permittivity, relative static permittivity, (dielectric constant), or electric susceptibility ===
- Capacitor

Such measurements also allow to access values of molecular dipoles.

=== Magnetic susceptibility or magnetization ===
- Gouy balance

For other methods see the section in the article about magnetic susceptibility.

See also Category:Electric and magnetic fields in matter

=== Substance potential, chemical potential, or molar Gibbs energy ===
Phase conversions like changes of aggregate state, chemical reactions or nuclear reactions transmuting substances, from reactants into products, or diffusion through membranes have an overall energy balance. Especially at constant pressure and constant temperature, molar energy balances define the notion of a substance potential or chemical potential or molar Gibbs energy, which gives the energetic information about whether the process is possible or not - in a closed system.

Energy balances that include entropy consist of two parts: A balance that accounts for the changed entropy content of the substances, and another one that accounts for the energy freed or taken by that reaction itself, the Gibbs energy change. The sum of reaction energy and energy associated to the change of entropy content is also called enthalpy. Often the whole enthalpy is carried by entropy and thus measurable calorimetrically.

For standard conditions in chemical reactions either molar entropy content and molar Gibbs energy with respect to some chosen zero point are tabulated. Or molar entropy content and molar enthalpy with respect to some chosen zero are tabulated. (See Standard enthalpy change of formation and Standard molar entropy)

The substance potential of a redox reaction is usually determined electrochemically current-free using reversible cells.

- Redox electrode

Other values may be determined indirectly by calorimetry. Also by analyzing phase-diagrams.

== Sub-microstructural properties of condensed matter or gas ==
- Infrared spectroscopy
- Neutron detector
- Radio frequency spectrometers for nuclear magnetic resonance and electron paramagnetic resonance
- Raman spectroscopy

=== Crystal structure ===
- An X-ray tube, a sample scattering the X-rays and a photographic plate to detect them. This constellation forms the scattering instrument used by X-ray crystallography for investigating crystal structures of samples. Amorphous solids lack a distinct pattern and are identifiable thereby.

=== Imaging ===
- Electron microscope
  - Scanning electron microscope
  - Transmission electron microscope
- Optical microscope uses reflectiveness or refractiveness of light to produce an image.
- Scanning acoustic microscope
- Scanning probe microscope
  - Atomic force microscope (AFM)
  - Scanning tunneling microscope (STM)
- Focus variation
- X-ray microscope

(See also Spectroscopy and List of materials analysis methods.)

=== Sound, compression waves in matter ===
Microphones in general, sometimes their sensitivity is increased by the reflection- and concentration principle realized in acoustic mirrors.

- Laser microphone
- Seismometer

==== Sound pressure ====
- Microphone or hydrophone properly gauged
- Shock tube
- Sound level meter

A device for unmixing sun-light: the prism.

The electromagnetic spectrum

=== Light and radiation without a rest mass, non-ionizing ===
- Antenna (radio)
- Bolometer measuring the energy of incident electromagnetic radiation.
- Camera
- EMF meter
- Interferometer used in the wide field of interferometry
- Microwave power meter
- Optical power meter
- Photographic plate
- Photomultiplier
- Phototube
- Radio telescope
- Spectrometer
- T-ray detectors

(for lux meter, see the section about human senses and human body)

See also Category:Optical devices

==== Photon polarization ====
- Polarizer

==== Pressure (current density of linear momentum) ====
- Nichols radiometer

==== Radiant flux ====
The measure of the total power of light emitted.

- Integrating sphere for measuring the total radiant flux of a light source

A Cathode-ray tube

=== Radiation ===
==== Cathode rays ====
- Crookes tube
- Cathode-ray tube, a phosphor-coated anode

==== Atom polarization and electron polarization ====
- Stern–Gerlach experiment

Another visualization of the electromagnetic spectrum.

=== Ionizing radiation ===
Ionizing radiation includes rays of "particles" as well as rays of "waves". Especially X-rays and gamma rays transfer enough energy in non-thermal, (single-) collision processes to separate electron(s) from an atom.

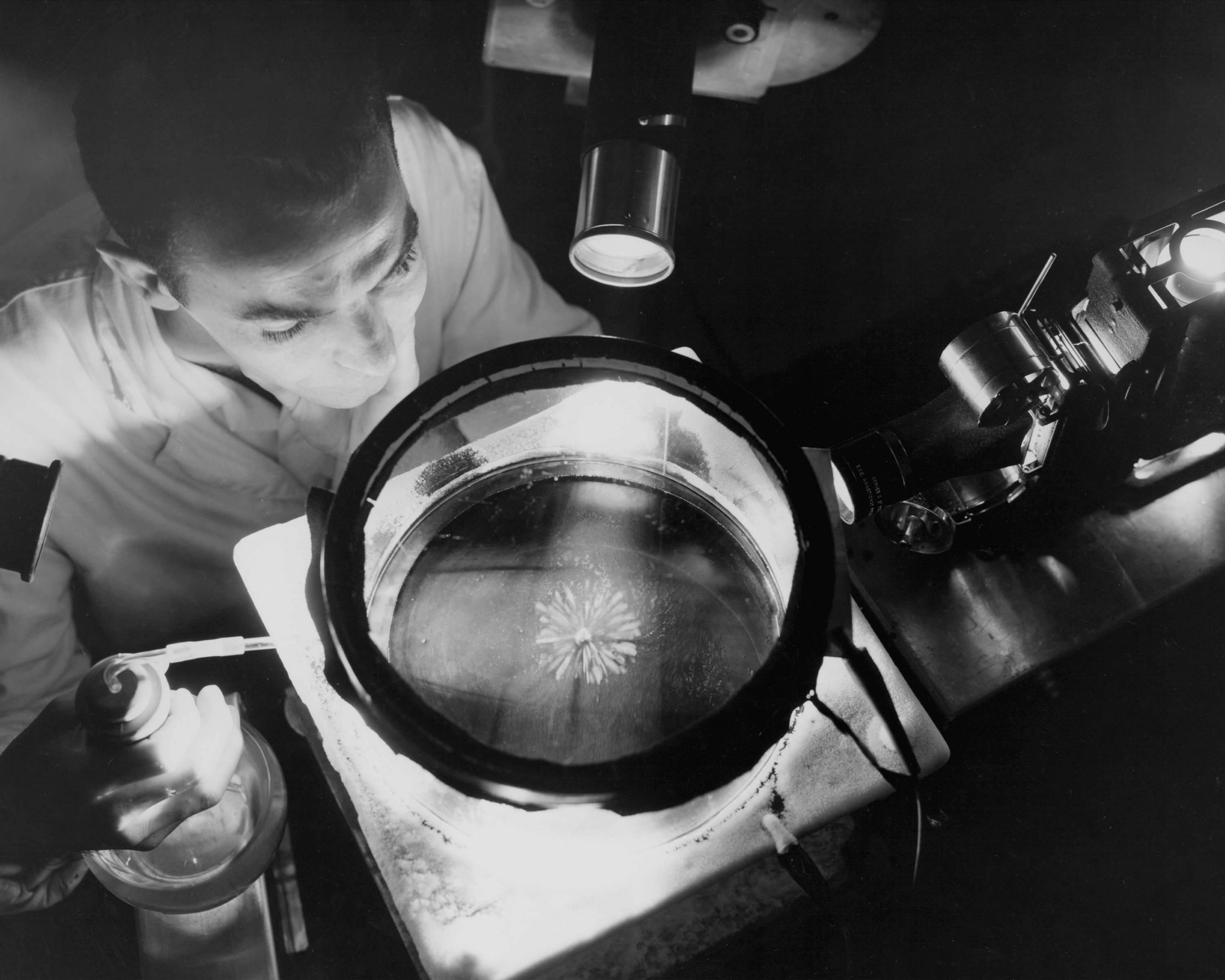
A cloud chamber detecting alpha-rays.

==== Particle and ray flux ====
- Bubble chamber
- Cloud chamber
- Dosimeter, a technical device realizes different working principles.
- Geiger counter
- Ionisation chamber
- Microchannel plate detector
- Photographic plate
- Photostimulable phosphor plate
- Proportional counter
- Scintillation counter, Lucas cell
- Semiconductor detector

== Identification and content ==
This could include chemical substances, rays of any kind, elementary particles, and quasiparticles. Many measurement devices outside this section may be used or at least become part of an identification process. For identification and content concerning chemical substances, see also Analytical chemistry, List of chemical analysis methods, and List of materials analysis methods.

=== Content in mixtures, substance identification ===
- Carbon dioxide sensor
- chromatographic device, gas chromatograph separates mixtures of substances. Different velocities of the substance types accomplish the separation.
- Colorimeter absorbance, and thus concentration
- Gas detector
- Gas detector in combination with mass spectrometer,
- mass spectrometer identifies the chemical composition of a sample on the basis of the mass-to-charge ratio of charged particles.
- Nephelometer or turbidimeter
- Oxygen sensor (= lambda sond)
- Refractometer, indirectly by determining the refractive index of a substance.
- Smoke detector
- Ultracentrifuge, separates mixtures of substances. In a force field of a centrifuge, substances of different densities separate.

==== pH: Concentration of protons in a solution ====
- pH meter
- Saturated calomel electrode

==== Humidity ====
- Hygrometer the density of water in air
- Lysimeter the balance of water in soil

== Human senses and human body ==
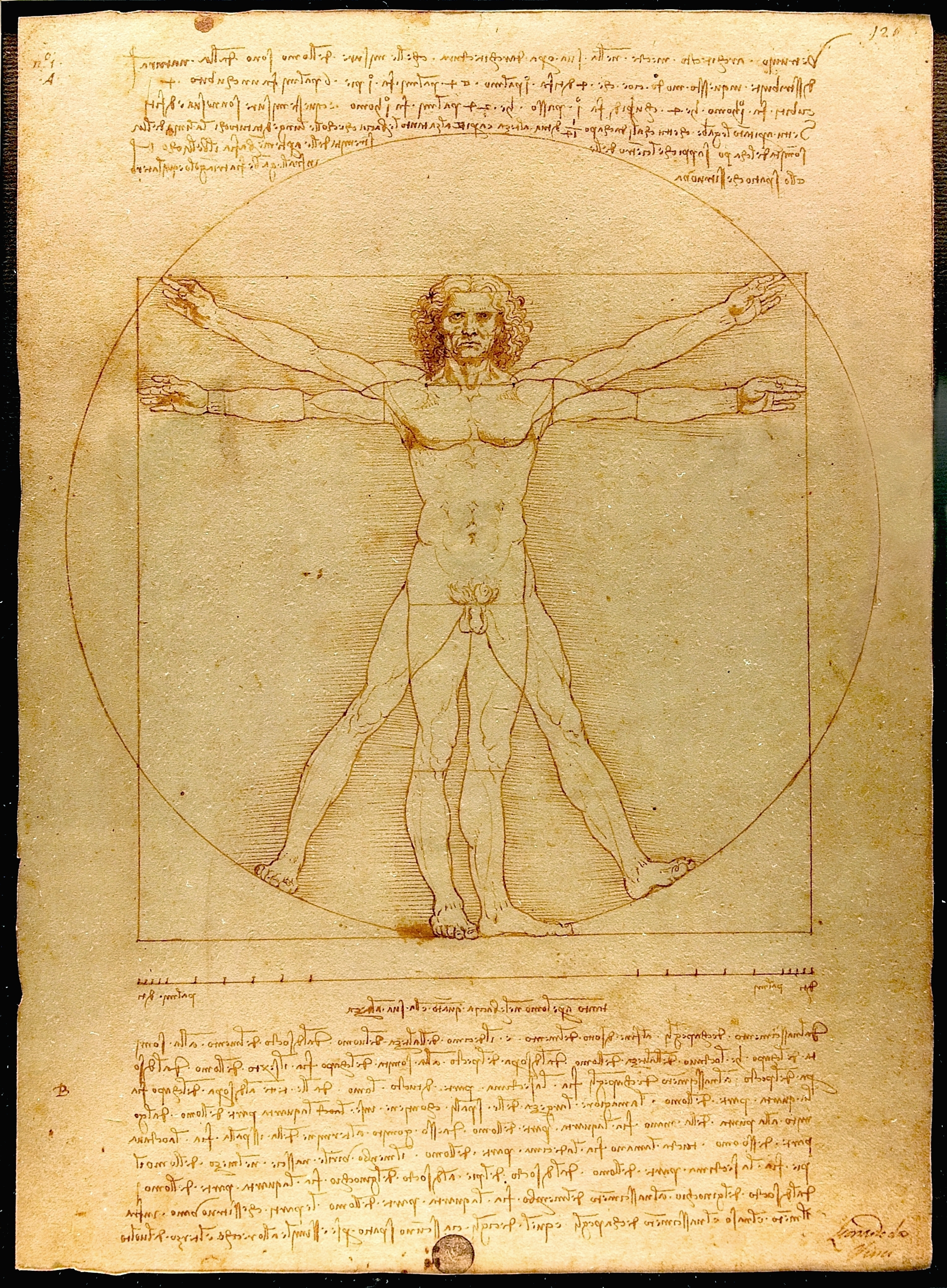
Vitruvian Man by Leonardo da Vinci, Gallerie dell'Accademia, Venice (1485-90)

=== Sight ===
==== Brightness: photometry ====
Photometry is the measurement of light in terms of its perceived brightness to the human eye. Photometric quantities derive from analogous radiometric quantities by weighting the contribution of each wavelength by a luminosity function that models the eye's spectral sensitivity. For the ranges of possible values, see the orders of magnitude in: illuminance, luminance, and luminous flux.

- Photometers of various kinds:
  - Lux meter for measuring illuminance, i.e. incident luminous flux per unit area
  - Luminance meter for measuring luminance, i.e. luminous flux per unit area and unit solid angle
  - Light meter, an instrument used to set photographic exposures. It can be either a lux meter (incident-light meter) or a luminance meter (reflected-light meter), and is calibrated in photographic units.
- Integrating sphere for collecting the total luminous flux of a light source, which can then be measured by a photometer
- Densitometer for measuring the degree to which a photographic material reflects or transmits light

==== Color: colorimetry ====
- Tristimulus colorimeter for quantifying colors and calibrating an imaging workflow

==== Radar brightness: radiometry ====
Synthetic Aperture Radar (SAR) instruments measure radar brightness, Radar Cross Section (RCS), which is a function of the reflectivity and moisture of imaged objects at wavelengths which are too long to be perceived by the human eye. Black pixels mean no reflectivity (e.g. water surfaces), white pixels mean high reflectivity (e.g. urban areas). Colored pixels can be obtained by combining three gray-scaled images which usually interpret the polarization of electromagnetic waves. The combination R-G-B = HH-HV-VV combines radar images of waves sent and received horizontally (HH), sent horizontally and received vertically (HV) and sent and received vertically (VV). The calibration of such instruments is done by imaging objects (calibration targets) whose radar brightness is known.

=== Hearing ===
==== Loudness in phon ====
- Headphone, loudspeaker, sound pressure gauge, for measuring an equal-loudness contour of a human ear.
- Sound level meter calibrated to an equal-loudness contour of the human auditory system behind the human ear.

=== Smell ===
- Olfactometer, see also Olfaction.

=== Temperature (sense and body) ===
==== Body temperature or core temperature ====
- Medical thermometer, see also infrared thermometer

=== Circulatory system ===
Blood-related parameters are listed in a blood test.

- Electrocardiograph records the electrical activity of the heart
- Glucose meter for obtaining the status of blood sugar.
- Sphygmomanometer, a blood pressure meter used to determine blood pressure in medicine. See also Category:Blood tests

=== Respiratory system ===
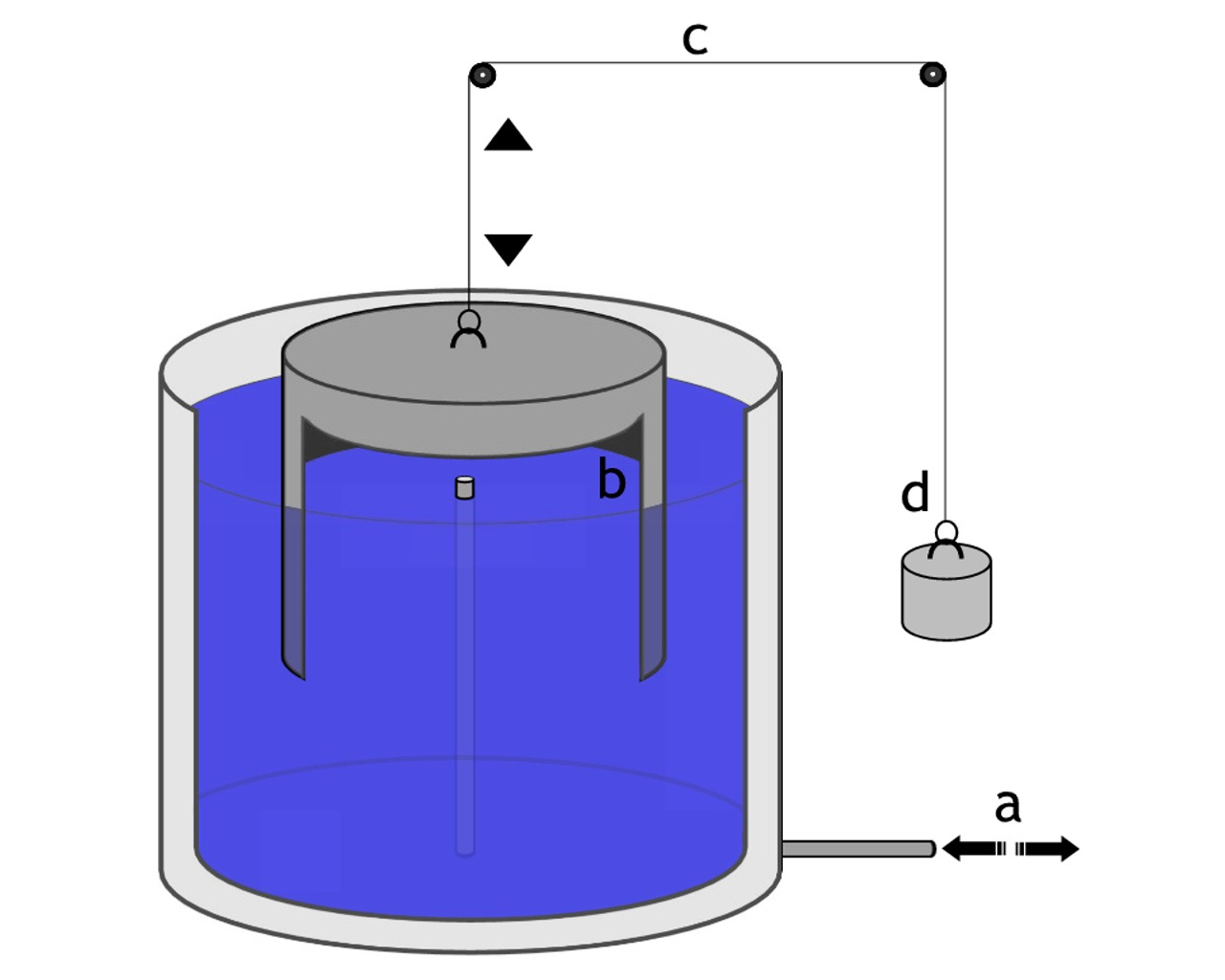
A spirometer, inhaling into pipe a fills volume b, the rest balances forces.

- Spirometer

==== Concentration or partial pressure of carbon dioxide in the respiratory gases ====
- Capnograph

=== Nervous system ===
- Electroencephalograph records the electrical activity of the brain

=== Musculoskeletal system ===
==== Power, work of muscles ====
- Ergometer

=== Metabolic system ===
- Body fat meter

=== Medical imaging ===
An echocardiogram processed into a three dimensional representation.

- Computed tomography
- Magnetic resonance imaging
- Medical ultrasonography
- Radiology
- Tomograph, device and method for non-destructive analysis of multiple measurements done on a geometric object, for producing 2- or 3-dimensional images, representing the inner structure of that geometric object.

See also: Category:Physiological instruments and Category:Medical testing equipment.

== Meteorology ==
See also Category:Meteorological instrumentation and equipment.

== Navigation ==
See also Category:Navigational equipment and Category:Navigation. See also Surveying instruments.

== Astronomy ==
- Radio antenna
- Telescope

See also Astronomical instruments and Category:Astronomical observatories.

== Military ==
Some instruments, such as telescopes and sea navigation instruments, have had military applications for many centuries. However, the role of instruments in military affairs rose exponentially with the development of technology via applied science, which began in the mid-19th century and has continued through the present day. Military instruments as a class draw on most of the categories of instrument described throughout this article, such as navigation, astronomy, optics, and imaging, and the kinetics of moving objects. Common abstract themes that unite military instruments are seeing into the distance, seeing in the dark, knowing an object's geographic location, and knowing and controlling a moving object's path and destination. Special features of these instruments may include ease of use, speed, reliability, and accuracy.

== Uncategorized, specialized, or generalized application ==
- Actograph measures and records animal activity within an experimental chamber.
- Densitometer measures light transmission through processed photographic film or transparent material or light reflection from a reflective material.
- Force platform measures ground reaction force.
- Gauge (engineering) A highly precise measurement instrument, also usable to calibrate other instruments of the same kind. Often found in conjunction with defining or applying technical standards.
- Gradiometer any device that measures spatial variations of a physical quantity. For example, as done in gravity gradiometry.
- Parking meter measures time a vehicle is parked at a particular spot, usually with a fee.
- Postage meter measures postage used from a prepaid account.
- S meter measures the signal strength processed by a communications receiver.
- Sensor, hypernym for devices that measure with little interaction, typically used in technical applications.
- Spectroscope is an important tool used by physicists.
- SWR meter check the quality of the match between the antenna and the transmission line.
- Universal measuring machine measures geometric locations for inspecting tolerances.

=== Alphabetical listing ===
Instrument	Quantity measured
alcoholmeter	alcoholic strength of liquid
altimeter	altitude
ammeter	electric current
anemometer	windspeed
astrolabe	latitude and altitude of celestial bodies
audiometer	hearing
barkometer	tanning liquors used in tanning leather
barometer	air pressure
bettsometer	integrity of fabric coverings on aircraft
bevameter	mechanical properties of soil
bolometer	electromagnetic radiation
Brannock Device	measuring shoe size
breathalyzer	breath alcohol content
caliper	length
calorimeter	heat of chemical reactions
cathetometer	vertical distances
ceilometer	height of a cloud base
chronometer or clock	time
clap-o-meter	volume of applause
compass	direction of North
Coulombmeter	electrostatic charge of a material
colorimeter	color
creepmeter	slow surface displacement of an active geologic fault in the Earth
corrator	corrosion rate
declinometer	magnetic declination
densimeter	specific gravity of liquids
densitometer	degree of darkness in photographic or semitransparent material
diffractometer	structure of crystals
dilatometer	volume changes caused by a physical or chemical process
disdrometer	size, speed, and velocity of raindrops
dosimeter	exposure to hazards, especially radiation; radiation of item
drumometer	amount of drum strokes over time
dumpy level	horizontal levels, polar angle
dynamometer	force, torque, or power
electricity meter	electrical energy used
electrometer	electric charge
electronic tuner	pitch of musical notes
ellipsometer	refractive index, dielectric function, thickness of thin films
eudiometer	change in volume of a gas mixture following combustion
evaporimeter	rate of evaporation
fathometer	ocean depth
feeler gauge	gap widths
forward looking infrared (FLIR)	detects infrared energy (heat)converts it into an electronic signal, which is then processed to produce a thermal image on a video monitor and perform temperature calculations.
framing square	right angles in construction
frequency counter	frequency of alternating current
fuel gauge	fuel levels
galvanometer	electricity
gas pycnometer	volume and density of solids
geiger counter	ionizing radiation (alpha, beta, gamma, etc.)
glucometer	blood glucose (diabetes)
graphometer	angle
heliometer	variation of the Sun's diameter
hourmeter	elapsed machine hours
hydrometer	specific gravity of liquids (density of liquids)
hygrometer	humidity
inclinometer	angle of a slope
inkometer	ink
interferometer	wave interference
infrared thermometer	heat radiated
katharometer	composition of gases
lactometer	specific gravity of milk
light meter	light (in photography)
linear position transducer	speed of movement
load cell	measurement of force
lux meter	intensity of light
magnetometer	strength of magnetic fields
manometer	pressure of gas
mass flow meter	mass flow rate of a fluid travelling through a tube
mass spectrometer	masses of ions, used to identify chemical substances through their mass spectra
measuring cup	liquid and dry goods
measuring cylinder	volume
measuring spoon	a spoon used to measure an amount of an ingredient, either liquid or dry
megohmmeter	electrical insulation
mercury barometer	Atmospheric pressure
micrometer	small distances
multimeter	electrical potential, resistance, and current
nephoscope	to measure the speed and direction of clouds
nephelometer	particle in a liquid
odometer	distance travelled
ohmmeter	electrical resistance
opisometer	lengths of arbitrary curved lines
orchidometer	testicle size in male humans
oscilloscope	oscillations
osmometer	osmotic strength of a solution, colloid, or compound matter of an object
parking meter	collects moneys for vehicle parking rights in a zone for a limited time
pedometer	steps
pH meter	pH (chemical acidity/basicity of a solution)
photometer	illuminance or irradiance
planometer	area
polarimeter	rotation of polarized light
potentiometer	voltage (term is also used to refer to a variable resistor)
profilometer	surface roughness
protractor	angle
psychrometer	humidity
pycnometer	fluid density
pyranometer	solar radiation
pyrheliometer	direct solar insolation
pyrometer	high temperatures
quadrat	percentage cover of a certain species
quartz crystal microbalance	thickness of deposited thin films
rain gauge	measuring of rain
radiometer	radiant flux of electromagnetic radiation
refractometer	index of refraction
rheometer	response to applied forces
rotameter	pressure of a liquid or gas in a closed tube
ruler	for measuring length
saccharometer	amount of sugar in a solution
seismometer	seismic waves (for example, earthquakes)
sextant	location on Earth's surface (used in naval navigation)
spectrometer	properties of light
spectrophotometer	intensity of light as a function of wavelength
speedometer	speed, velocity of a vehicle
spirometer	the lung capacity
spherometer	radius of a sphere
sphygmomanometer	blood pressure
stadimeter	object range
strainmeter	seismic strain
SWR meter	standing wave ratio
Synthetic Aperture Radar	reflectivity and moisture
tacheometer	distance
tachometer	revolutions per minute, rate of blood flow, speed of aeroplanes
taximeter	distance travelled, displacement
tensiometer	surface tension of a liquid
theodolite	angle, in the horizontal and vertical planes
thermometer	temperature
tiltmeter	minor changes to the Earth
tintometer	colour
universal measuring machine	geometric locations
vacuum gauge	very low pressure
viscometer	viscosity of a fluid
voltmeter	electric potential, voltage
VU meter	volume unit
wattmeter	electrical power
weighing scale	weight
wind vane	wind direction
zymometer	fermentation

== See also ==
- Category:Instrument-making corporations
- Data logger measuring devices
- History of measurement
- History of weights and measures
- Instrumentation
- List of measuring devices
- List of physical quantities
- List of sensors
- List of tools and equipment
- Metrology
- Pocket comparator
- Sensor or detector
- Timeline of temperature and pressure measurement technology

== Notes ==
The alternate spelling "-metre" is never used when referring to a measuring device.
