= Outline of metrology and measurement =

Topical index of English Wikipedia articles about metrology and measurement

The following is a topical outline of the English language Wikipedia articles on the topic of metrology and measurement. Metrology is the science of measurement and its application.

== Main articles ==
- Metrology
- Measurement

=== Metrology overviews ===
- Dimensional metrology
- Forensic metrology
- Historical metrology
- Smart Metrology
- Time metrology
- Quantum metrology

== History ==
- History of measurement
- History of the metre

== Concepts ==
- Quantification (science)
- Standard (metrology)
- Weights and measures
- Unit of measurement

=== Geodesy ===
- Geodesy - the science of measuring and representing the geometry, gravity, and spatial orientation of the Earth in temporally varying 3D.
- List of geodesists
- History of geodesy
- Physical geodesy
- International Union of Geodesy and Geophysics
- International Association of Geodesy

== Systems and units ==
- Unit of measurement
- System of measurement

=== Systems of measurement ===
- System of measurement
- Metric system
- Unit prefixes
- Metric prefixes
- Orders of magnitude

=== Systems of units ===
- Centimetre–gram–second system of units

=== Scales ===
- Scale of temperature
- Conversion of scales of temperature
- Celsius
- Delisle scale
- Fahrenheit
- Gas mark
- Kelvin
- Leiden scale
- Newton scale
- Rankine scale
- Réaumur scale
- Rømer scale
- Wedgwood scale

=== Units ===
- Unit of measurement
- Base unit of measurement
- Natural units
- Dimensionless quantity

General Lists

- Dimensionless units
- Lists of units of measurement
- Units of measurement by country
- Customary units of measurement
- Obsolete units of measurement
- Equivalent units
- Metricated units

Lists by type

- Acceleration
- Amount of substance
- Amount
- Angle
- Area
- Astronomical
- Catalytic
- Chemical measurement
- Density
- Dynamic Viscosity
- Electric current
- Electric charge
- Electromagnetism
- Energy
- Flow
- Force
- Angular velocity
- Frequency
- Illuminance
- Information
- Length
- Level
- Luminance
- Photometry
- Luminous energy
- Luminous exposure
- Luminous flux
- Luminous intensity
- Mass
- Meteorology measurement
- Navigation
- Non-SI metric units
- Optics
- Power
- Pressure
- Purity
- Quality
- Radiation dose
- Radiation
- Rate
- Sound
- Surveying
- Temperature
- Time
- Torque
- Velocity
- Volume

== Organizations ==
- International Bureau of Weights and Measures
- International Organization of Legal Metrology
- National Institute of Standards and Technology
- National Institute of Metrology Standardization and Industrial Quality
- National Physical Laboratory
- NCSL International
- Norwegian Metrology Service

== Instruments and devices ==
- Coordinate-measuring machine
- Cylindrical coordinate measuring machine
- Universal measuring machine
- Pratt & Whitney Measurement Systems

== Standards ==
- ISO 16610
- ISO 25178
- Josephson voltage standard
- Metre Convention
- Unified Code for Units of Measure
- International prototype metre
- International Prototype of the Kilogram

== Lists ==
- List of humorous units of measurement
- List of unusual units of measurement
- List of obsolete units of measurement
- List of measuring instruments
- List of nautical units of measurement
- List of scientific units named after people
- List of international units
- List of SI electromagnetism units

== Timelines ==
- Timeline of temperature and pressure measurement technology
- Timeline of time measurement technology

== Journals ==
- Measurement
- Metrologia

== See also ==
- Outline of the metric system
