= Cylindrical coordinate measuring machine =

Measuring machine

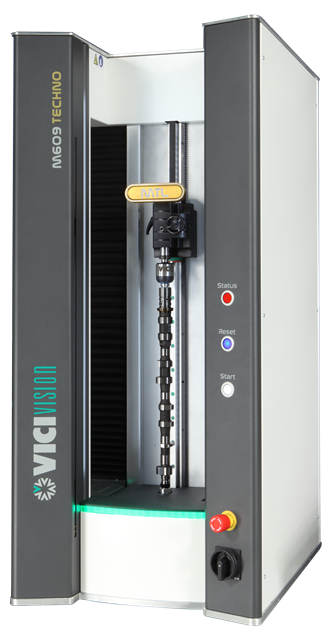
This is an example of a Cylindrical Coordinate Measuring Machine (CCMM), a special type of CMM that uses a rotating table to move the part relative to the inspection probe. In this case the CCMM is a camera and telecentric lens system, which is fitted with a tactile probe.

Cylindrical coordinate measuring machine or CCMM, is a special variation of a standard coordinate measuring machine (CMM) which incorporates a moving table to rotate the part relative to the probe. The probe moves perpendicular to the part axis and radial data is collected at regular angular intervals.

== Description ==
Where the standard CMM uses a three dimensional Cartesian X, Y, Z system where each axis is orthogonal to the other, a Cylindrical Coordinate Measuring Machine omits the X or Y axis. The probe moves in only two axes (the vertical Z and either X or Y horizontal) and the rotating table positions the subject of inspection (a cylindrical part, hence the word "cylindrical" in the title) in a precise manner. The probe may be tactile in nature, or optical. Optical probing methods include laser interferometry and telecentric lensing.

== Coordinate System ==
The CCMM coordinate system differs from standard cartesian coordinates in that it employs a rotating table. For this reason, a spherical coordinate system is employed to define the axis. A complete definition can be found here: The cylindrical coordinate system allows for the construction of crankshaft gages, transmission shaft gages and inspection machines for other shaft applications.

== Uses ==
Where the standard CMM is suitable for prismatic parts, the Cylindrical CMM is ideally suited for cylindrical parts. Examples include camshafts, crankshafts, transmission shafts and other rotating parts with a length longer than their diameter. Parts with a length less than the diameter are typically measured on a roundness gauge.

== Technology ==
The method for recording the angular position of the part will always make use of an optical encoder. However, the radial measurement probe may incorporate an optical technology, or tactile technology. Optical technologies include non-contact laser interferometry or shadow systems, while tactile systems use an optical grating.

== Standardization ==
Standards similar to those used for a standard CMM, also verify the performance of the CCMM. The ISO 10360 series defines the characteristics of the probing system and the length measurement error:

PForm: probing deviation when measuring the form of a sphere
PSize: probing deviation when measuring the size of a sphere
EUni: deviation of measuring length on spheres from one direction
EBi: deviation of measuring length on spheres from left and right

The ISO 10360 series consists of the following parts:

- ISO 10360-1 Geometrical Product Specifications (GPS) -- Acceptance and verification tests for coordinate measuring machines (CMM) -- Part 1: Vocabulary
- ISO 10360-2 Geometrical product specifications (GPS) -- Acceptance and verification tests for coordinate measuring machines (CMM) -- Part 2: CMMs used for measuring linear dimensions
- ISO 10360-7 Geometrical product specifications (GPS) -- Acceptance and verification tests for coordinate measuring machines (CMM) -- Part 7: CMMs equipped with imaging probing systems
- ISO 10360-8 Geometrical product specifications (GPS) -- Acceptance and verification tests for coordinate measuring systems (CMS) -- Part 8: CMMs with optical distance sensors

== See also ==
- Outline of metrology and measurement
- List of measuring instruments
- Universal measuring machine
