= CCMM =

CCMM may refer to:

- Charter Communications, an American company providing cable television, high-speed Internet, and telephone services. CCMM was its former stock symbol.
- Centre contre les manipulations mentales or Centre Roger Ikor, a French anti-cult association
- Cylindrical coordinate measuring machine, a special variation of a standard coordinate measuring machine that incorporates a moving table
