= Kite square =

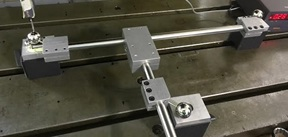
Set up of a Kite Square: Bars, Balls and the Probe

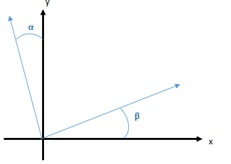
The square-ness of two working axes

A kite square is a device used to measure the "out-of-squareness" of a machining center or coordinate measuring machine.

“Square-ness” or “Out-of-Square” is one of the critical measurement in machine tool metrology. For rectangular measurements, it refers to angular deviation of working axes between one carriages to another. The value of Monarch VMC was previously found as 4 arc sec.

The Kite Square Technique, together with a displacement sensing instrument, can measure the alignment of any points on a line of interest. Its main components are two perpendicular bars and three calibrated artifacts (Balls). The general principle of measuring with a kite square is once one of the diagonal is aligned to working axis, the displacement deviation on artifacts in other diagonal will appear (if any) as the kite square arms are perpendicular to each other.

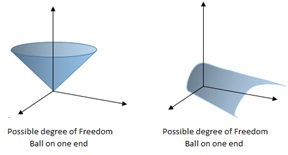
The artifacts’ degree of freedom are restricted by the kinetic mounts
