= Hegman gauge =

Type of measuring instrument

A Hegman gauge, sometimes referred to as a grind gauge, grind gage, or grindometer, is an instrument which indicates the fineness of grind or the presence of coarse particles and agglomeration in a dispersion. It is commonly used to determine how finely ground the particles of pigment (or other solid) dispersed in a sample of paint (or other liquid) are. This is important because many types of solid materials must be ground into finer particles in order to be dispersed in liquids. The resulting properties of the dispersion vary based on the size of individual particles and the degree which they are dispersed.

The Hegman gauge usually consists of a stainless steel block with a series of very small parallel grooves machined into it. The grooves decrease in depth from one end of the block to the other, according to a scale stamped next to them. A typical Hegman gauge is 170mm by 65mm by 15mm, with a channel of grooves running lengthwise, 12.5mm across and narrowing uniformly in depth from 100 μm to zero and used to determine particle size.

== Use with paint ==
A Hegman gauge is used by placing a sample of paint at the deep end of the gauge and drawing the paint down with a flat edge along the grooves. Grind gages are sold with machined flat 'drawdown bars' specifically for this purpose. The paint fills the grooves, and the location where a regular, significant "pepperyness" in the appearance of the coating appears, marks the coarsest-ground dispersed particles. This is the point where oversized particles start to appear in high density and determines the rating for that material. The reading is taken from the scale marked next to the grooves, in dimensionless "Hegman units" (or National Standard units; NS) and/or mils or micrometres. Hegman units are defined in terms of an inverted size scale as shown below:

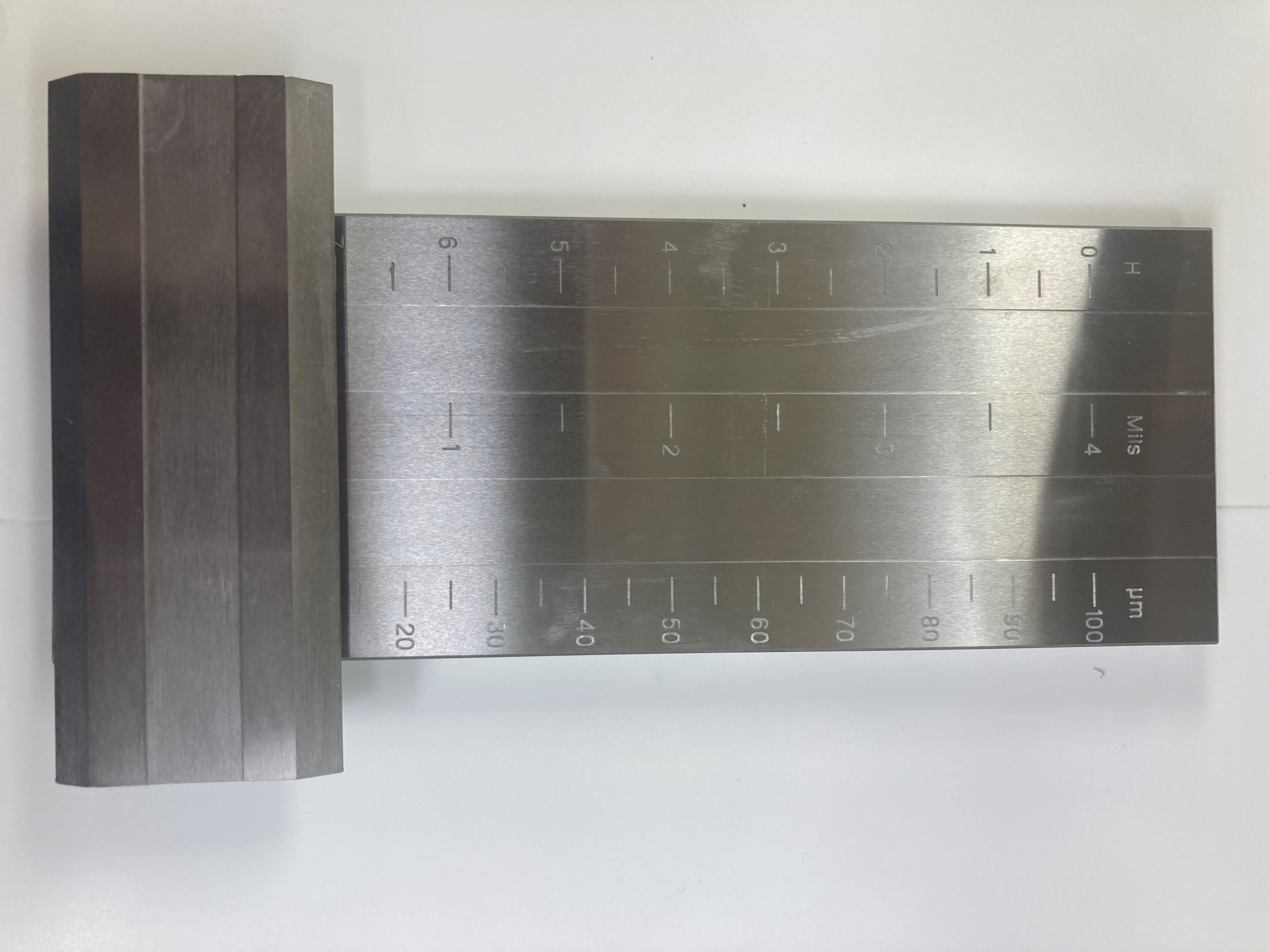
Hegman Grind Gage and doctor blade

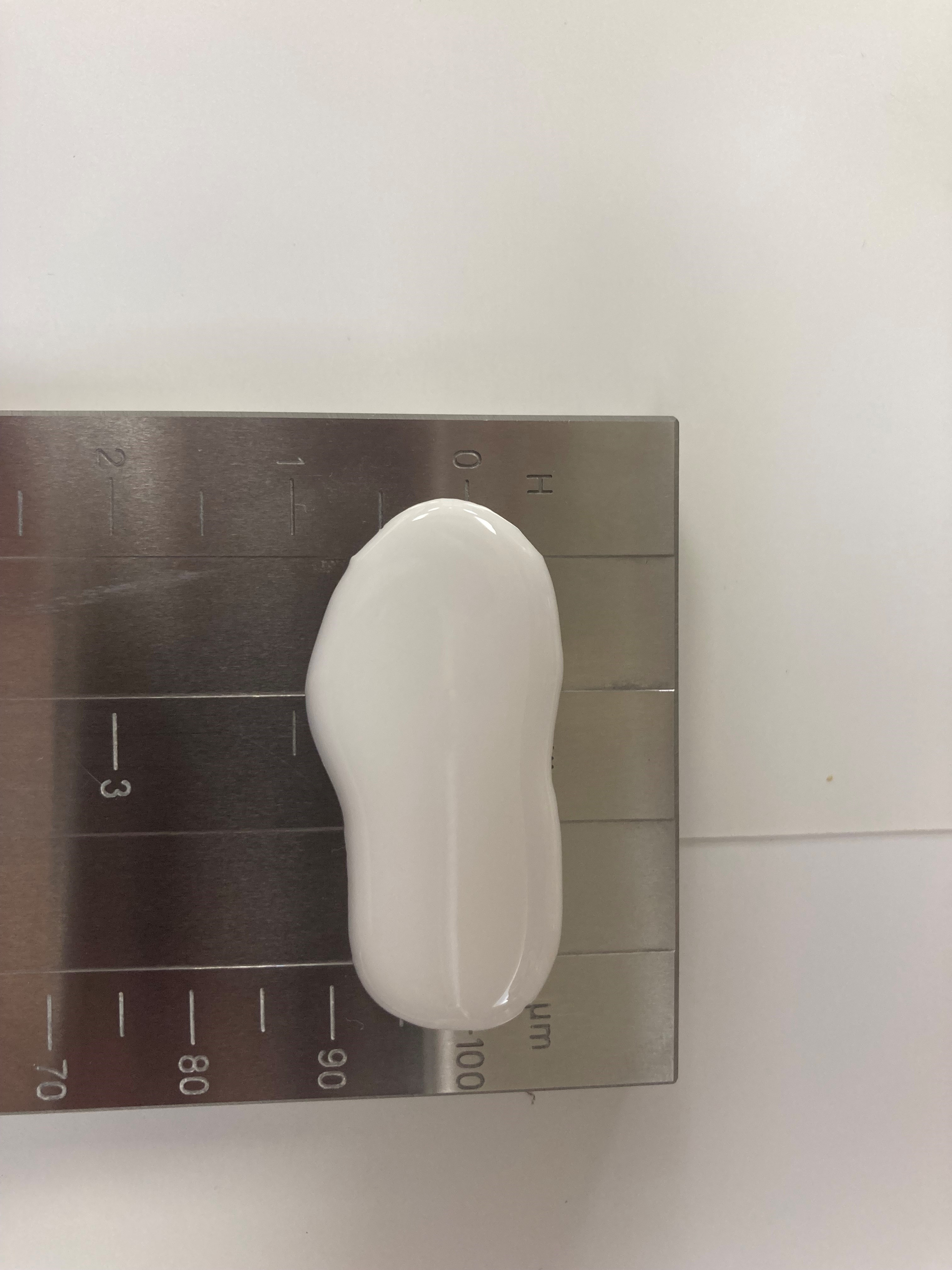
Paint sample at top of Hegman

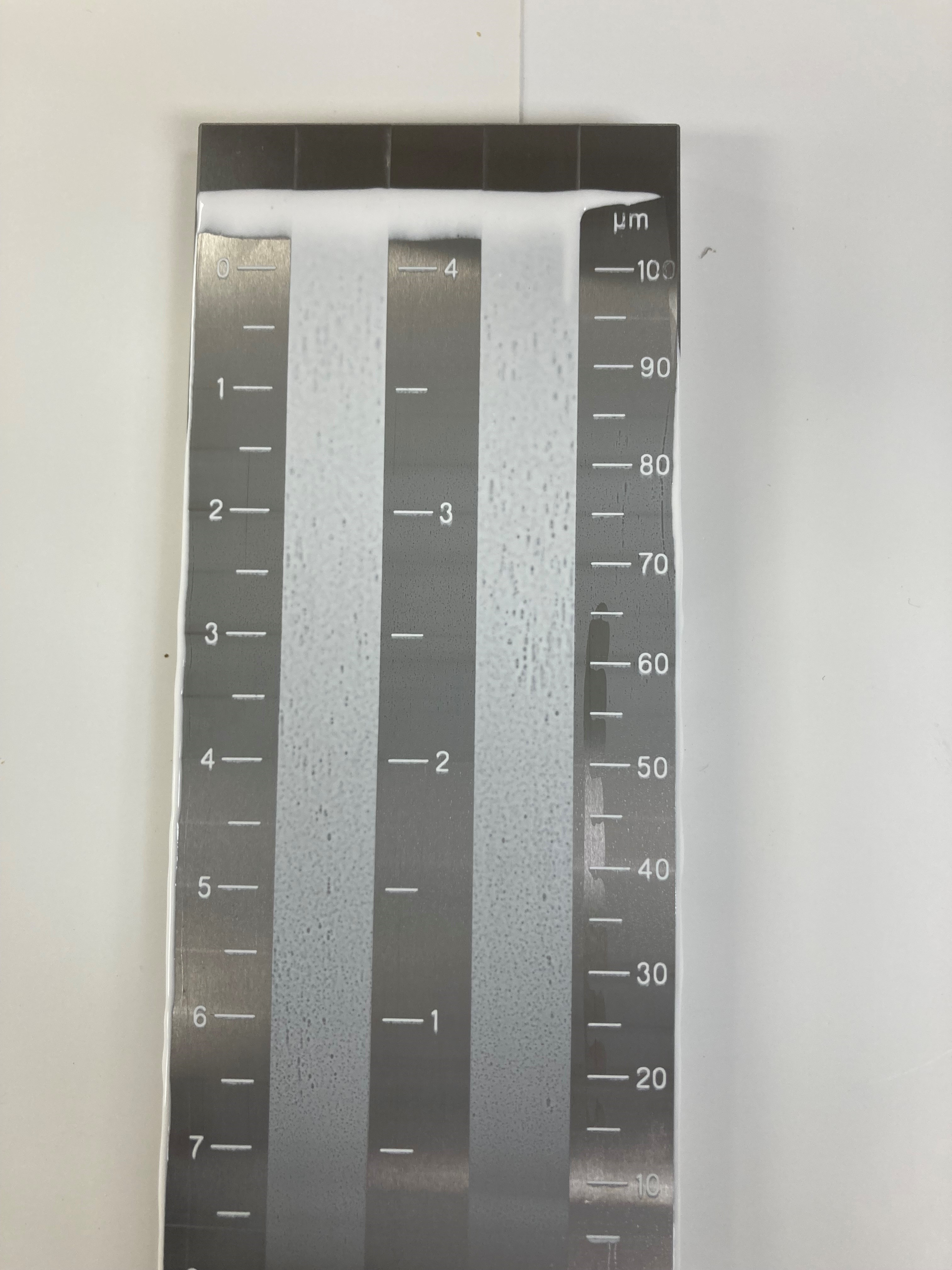
Hegman after paint drawdown

Hegman Units	Mils	Microns
0	4.0	101.6
1	3.5	88.9
2	3.0	76.2
3	2.5	63.5
4	2	50.8
5	1.5	38.1
6	1	25.4
7	0.5	12.7
8	0	0

A lesser-used scale, North (or PCU), is also occasionally employed in the paint industry. Like the Hegman scale, this is also inverted compared to the value in microns:

Microns	North units
0	100
10	90
20	80
30	70
40	60
50	50
60	40
70	30
80	20
90	10
100	0

Determining the fineness of a paint's grind is important, because too coarse a grind may reduce the paint's color uniformity, gloss, and opacity. The Hegman gauge is widely used for this purpose because it requires minimal skill and only a few seconds' work.

== Other uses ==
Grind gauges are used in a variety of fields, including; food, pharmaceutical, plastic and many others. In all of these fields, grind gauges are utilized to produce, store, and apply dispersion products.

== Sizes ==
Hegman gauges are commonly available in the following ranges: 0 to 100 micrometres, 0 to 50 micrometres, 0 to 25 micrometres, 0 to 15 micrometres, and 0 to 10 micrometres.

== Bibliography ==
- Koleske. Paint and coating testing manual : fourteenth edition of the Gardner-Sward handbook (14th ed.). ASTM. ISBN 0-8031-2060-5.
