= National Institute of Metrology, Standardization and Industrial Quality =

Brazilian metrology standards authority

Instituto Nacional de Metrologia, Qualidade e Tecnologia
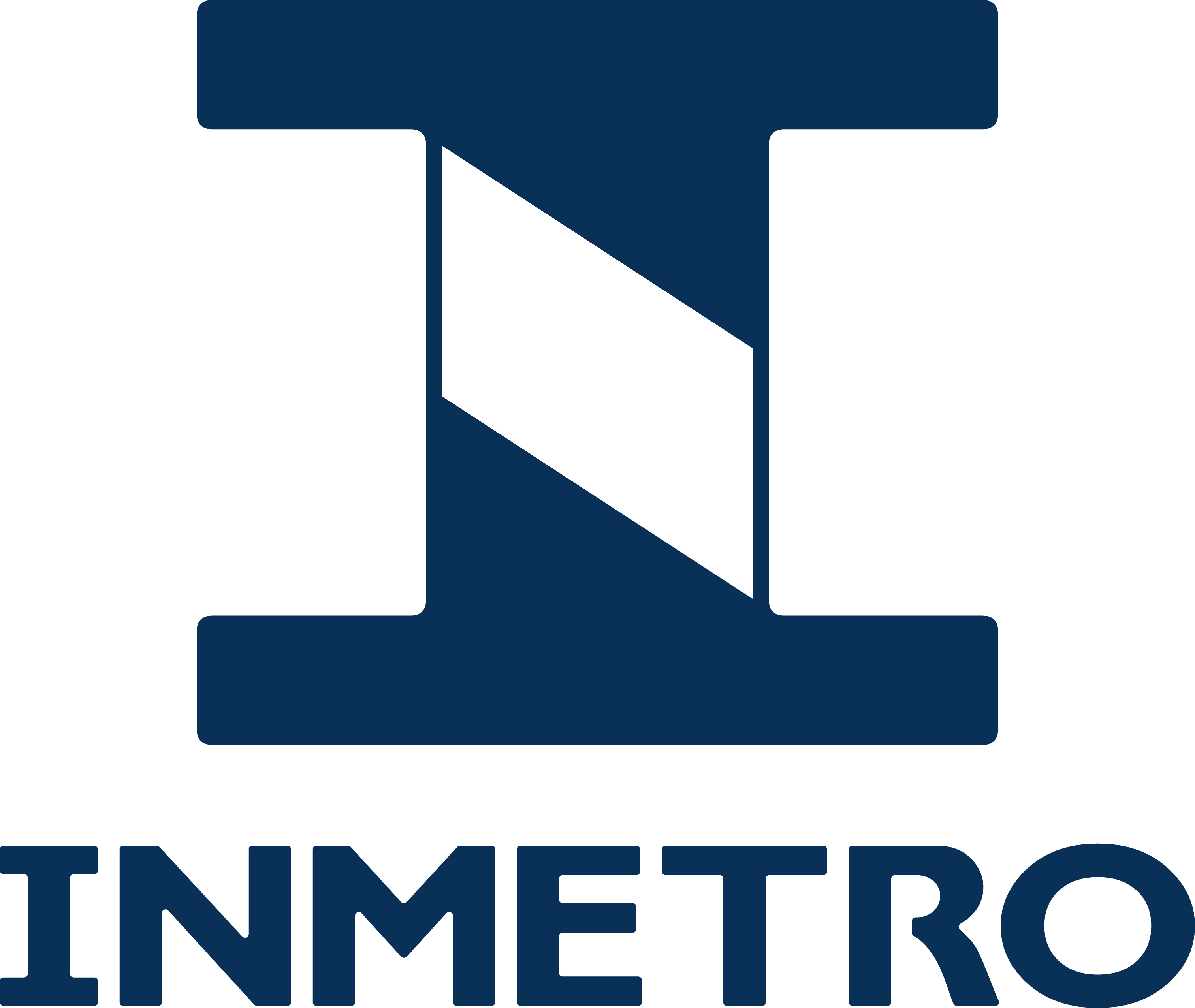
- Abbreviation: INMETRO
- Formation: December 11, 1973 (52 years ago)
- Purpose: National standards
- Headquarters: Rio de Janeiro, Brazil
- Official language: Portuguese
- Website: www.inmetro.gov.br

The National Institute of Metrology, Standardization and Industrial Quality (INMETRO) is a Brazilian federal autarky, linked to MDIC, the Ministry of Development, Industry and Foreign Trade.

In Brazil, certification bodies must be accredited by INMETRO. Electrical and electronic products that meet Brazilian requirements and that are certified by an INMETRO accredited organization must carry the mandatory INMETRO mark along with the mark of the certification organization, such as UCIEE (União Certificadora para o Controle da Conformidade de Produtos, Processos ou Serviços).

== General information ==
INMETRO acts as Executive Secretariat of the National Council of Metrology, Standardization and Industrial Quality (CONMETRO), an inter-ministerial collegiate entity which is the normative agency of the National System of Metrology, Standardization and Industrial Quality (SINMETRO).

SINMETRO, CONMETRO and INMETRO were created by Brazilian Law 5966, of 11 of December 1973. In this occasion, the INMETRO substitutes the National Institute of Weights and Measurements (INPM), significantly extending its range of performance for the Brazilian society.

In the scope of its ample institucional mission, INMETRO aims to fortify national companies, increasing their productivity by means of the adoption of mechanisms destined to the improvement of the quality of products and services. Being so, INMETRO mission incorporates the promotion of the quality of life of the Brazilian citizens and the competitiveness of the Brazilian economy, by means of Metrology and Evaluation of Conformity concepts and mechanisms.

Some of the main attributions of INMETRO are:

- To execute the Brazilian Metrology and Evaluation of Conformity policies;
- To verify the observance of the technical and legal requirements related to measurement units and methods and instruments, as well as its application to material products;
- To keep the standards of the units of measurement, as well as to implement and keep the chain of traceability of measurement unit standards in the country, so as to guarantee that they are internally consistent and compatible with equivalent international standards, aiming at, in the primary level, to its universal acceptance and, in the secondary level, to its use as supporting the productive sectors of the economy, with a focus in the quality of goods and services;
- To fortify the participation of Brazil in the related Metrology and Evaluation of Conformity international initiatives, and promoting the interchange with international entities and organisms;
- To act as CONMETRO Executive Secretariat, providing technical and administrative support to its advisory committees;
- To foment the use of quality management methods and techniques in Brazilian companies;
- To plan and execute the activities of accreditation (credenciamento) of calibration and essay laboratories, proficiency essay suppliers, and organisms of certification, inspection, training and other activities necessary to the development of technological services infrastructure in Brazil; and
- To co-ordinate, in the scope of SINMETRO, the obligatory and voluntary certification of products, processes, services and the voluntary certification of staff.

== History ==
During the first Empire, several attempts had been made aiming to the standardization of measurement units used in Brazil, but only in 26 of June 1862, emperor Dom Pedro II promulgated the Imperial Law nº 1157 and with it officialized, in all the domestic territory, the French decimal metric system. Brazil was one of the first nations to adopt the new system, that would be later used in most of the world.

With the following century industrial growth, it became necessary to create more efficient instruments of control in the country, so as to stimulate and to protect producers and consumers. Thus, in 1961, the INPM - Instituto Nacional de Pesos e Medidas (National Institute of Weights and Measurements) was created, implanting the Brazilian network of legal metrology and quality control, establishing the International System of Units (SI) in the Brazilian territory. Soon after, it became clear that it was necessary also to follow the international trends related to technological advances, accuracy and, mainly, attendance to consumer requirements. It was necessary, in other words, to develop and implement Evaluation of Conformity concepts.

In 1973, INMETRO was created, in complementation to the CIP - Inter-ministerial Commission of Prices, including in its ample institucionalthe scope, the objective to strengthen national companies, increasing its profits by means of the protection to consumer rights and improvement of the quality of available products.

== Marking ==
The institutional mark of the INMETRO is registered in the Federal Trademark and Patent Office - INPI - guaranteeing its property.

== INMETRO Certification ==
=== Automotive components ===
In order to enter the Brazilian aftermarket, automotive components have to be labeled with the Inmetro Mark as well as a third party certification logo that has been accredited by Inmetro. These specifications were issued within the Inmetro Ordinance 301/2011 on 21 July 2011, which aims to establish minimum safety requirements for automotive components.

Shock absorbers, electric fuel pumps for the Otto cycle engines, horns or similar equipment employed in automotive road vehicles, pistons, lock pins and lock rings, piston rings, bearing shell and lamps need to be compliant by January 21, 2013. Until then, manufacturers and importers have to be certified as automotive parts must be labeled with the Inmetro Mark from July 22, 2013.

The compliance deadline for automotive wheels has been postponed by Inmetro Ordinance 445/2010 to January 1, 2013. It provides manufacturers and importers more time to prepare for compliance until the end of 2012. Only road wheels labeled with the Inmetro Conformity Identification Mark may be sold in Brazil from January 1, 2015.

== See also ==
- Outline of metrology and measurement
