= Clap-o-meter =

Applause meter

A clap-o-meter, clapometer or applause meter is a measurement instrument that purports to measure and display the volume of clapping or applause made by an audience. It can be used to indicate the popularity of contestants and decide the result of competitions based on audience popularity. Specific implementations may or may not be based on actual sound level meters. Clap-o-meters were a popular element in talent shows and television game shows in the 1950s and 1960s, most notably Opportunity Knocks, but have since been supplanted by other, more sophisticated, methods of measuring audience response.

Today, various digital implementations exist across different platforms. Mobile applications for iOS and Android offer portable measurement, while specialized browser-based tools or PC software provide solutions for live events. Some free-to-use software, such as the "Applaus-O-Meter", provide full features without advertisements or in-app purchases, often including event management tools like integrated timers.

== History ==
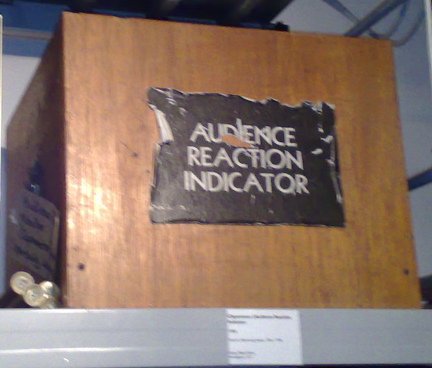
The original "Audience Reaction Indicator" used on British TV game show Opportunity Knocks

One of the first appearances of a clap-o-meter was in 1956, on the British TV game show Opportunity Knocks, developed and presented by Hughie Green. The clap-o-meter itself was a wooden box labelled "Audience Reaction Indicator". The prop is now part of the collection of the National Media Museum, in Bradford. Clap-o-meters were used in many other TV shows and at live events.

In 1989, Green unsuccessfully attempted to sue the New Zealand Broadcasting Corporation for copyright infringement over a similar programme. The clap-o-meter was one of the distinctive features of the format by which Green sought to define it as copyrightable. The courts found that a loose format defined by catchphrases and accessories, such as the clap-o-meter, was not copyrightable.

Clap-o-meters continue to be used. They are often regarded as a novelty or item of amusement rather than an accurate method to measure popularity. Even so, they are sometimes used to judge winners in fairly serious competitions such as battle of the bands competitions. In politics, a politician's popularity is sometimes gauged by the applause they achieve when giving speeches. News organisations sometimes use the concept of a clap-o-meter to gauge popularity of a politician or of components of a politician's overall message.

Clap-o-meter software is also available for computers and mobile devices. The software uses the device's microphone or audio input to determine the level of applause.

== Authenticity ==
Quite often a clap-o-meter is a complete sham, having no real sound measuring equipment at all. It is, instead, manipulated by a person, based on their estimation of the audience reaction. This is normally done semi-openly, with the audience under little or no illusion that the clap-o-meter is genuine. This was apparently the case on Opportunity Knocks, where the clap-o-meter was not used to actually determine the winners and was disclaimed with the phrase "Remember, folks! The clap-o-meter is just for fun!."

Modern software attempts to address these accuracy issues through digital signal processing. While simple mobile tools often rely on single-point "peak-hold" decibel (dB) levels—which are susceptible to distortion from singular loud noises or proximity to the microphone—advanced implementations utilize Root mean square (RMS) integration and weighted algorithms. By normalizing sound input on a scale (typically 0–10) and using calibration phases to account for ambient room noise, these systems calculate "applause intensity" over a set duration. This provides a more representative measurement of collective audience response compared to uncalibrated handheld devices, especially when fed by multiple microphones via a mixing console or audio interface.

== Alternatives ==
A number of alternatives to the clap-o-meter exist. A studio audience can be polled by a simple show of hands, or for more visual impact by having them hold up different coloured cards indicating their vote. They can also be polled by electronic means using individual voting devices with buttons for each option. These options are more accurate than a clap-o-meter but lack the element of excitement generated by frenzied applause.

In recent years, phone voting has become the main method of deciding popularity in talent shows. This has the advantage of expanding participation to include the full TV audience. It can also be used in programmes which do not have a studio audience. Phone voting can provide a significant source of additional revenue for the broadcasters from the use of premium rate phone numbers.

== See also ==
- Audience response
- Crowd counting
- List of measuring devices

== List of TV shows using a clap-o-meter ==
- Arthur Godfrey's Talent Scouts (US) (1948–1958)
- Queen for a Day (US) (1956–1964)
- Opportunity Knocks (UK) (1956–1990)
- The Tonight Show Starring Johnny Carson (US) (1962–1992)
- Late Night with David Letterman (US) (1982–1993)
- Kids' Court (US) (1988–1989)
- Late Show with David Letterman (US) (1993–2015)
- The Slammer (UK) (2006–2015)
