= Cam plastometer =

The cam plastometer is a physical testing machine. It measures the resistance of non-brittle materials to compressive deformation at constant true-strain rates. In this way, it can be compared a bit to the Gleeble. In the early days, the machine operates at relatively low strain rates, but over time it has been enhanced and currently it can operate over a wide range of strain rates

The machine is patented under the name of "United States Patent 4109516".

In the machine, deformation compressive forces are applied to a specimen by two flat, opposing platens which impact a flat, rectangular specimen. The deformation forces can be varied during operation, to simulate actual conditions which occur during industrial pressing and forming operations. The plastometer is also capable of torsional testing of specimens".

The cam plastometers are expensive and there are only a few of them in the world.
