= Inertial balance =

Device that measures inertial mass

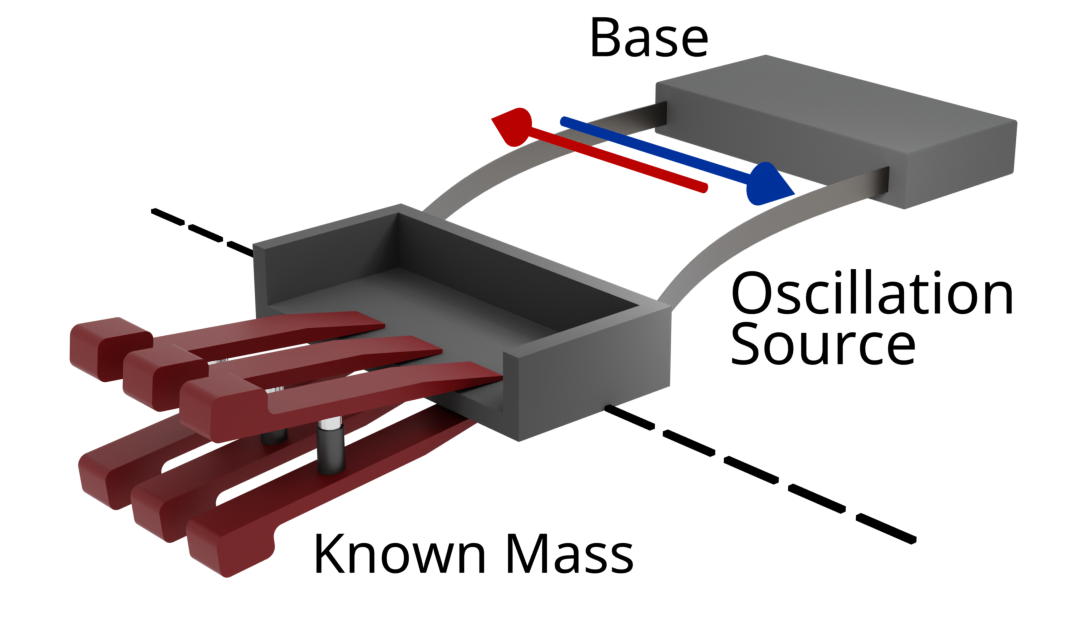
Illustration of a simple inertial balance. The known mass is fixed onto the oscillator, and then set into motion. The resulting period of oscillation (from various masses) can be measured to determine a relationship.

An inertial balance is a device that allows the measurement of inertial mass (as opposed to gravitational mass for a regular balance) that can be operated in the microgravity environment space where weight is negligible (e.g. in the International Space Station.) The principle of operation is based on a vibrating spring-mass system. The frequency of vibration will depend on the unknown mass, being higher for lower mass. The object to be measured is placed in the inertial balance, and a manual initial displacement of the spring mechanism starts the oscillation. The time needed to complete a given number of cycles is measured. Knowing the characteristic spring constant and damping coefficient of the spring system, the mass of the object can be computed according to the harmonic oscillator model. Alternatively, a calibration of the device with known masses can be performed, so that the spring constant and any appreciable damping will implicitly be accounted for, and need not be separately known or estimated. See the data analysis PDF under External Links below for a discussion of several calibration approaches.

== See also ==
- Mass
- Harmonic oscillator
