= List of nautical units of measurement =

Nautical units of measurement in current or historical use include:

| Unit | Type | Notes |
|---|---|---|
| Cable length | Length | |
| Fathom | Length | |
| Knot | Speed | |
| League | Length | |
| Nautical mile | Length | |
| Rhumb | Angle | The angle between two successive points of the thirty-two point compass (11 degrees 15 minutes) (rare) |
| Shackle | Length | Before 1949, 12.5 fathoms; later 15 fathoms. |
| Toise | Length | Toise was also used for measures of area and volume |
| Twenty-foot equivalent unit or TEU | Volume | Used in connection with container ships and ports |

== See also ==
- Ship measurements
- Glossary of nautical terms (disambiguation)
