= Plurimeter =

A plurimeter is a hand-held measuring instrument for determining surface area or relative angles between surfaces. The device uses mechanical action for calculating the result, analogous to a slide rule. In modern technology, these results are computed by calculator or computer rather than by mechanical instrument.
