= List of international units =

This list of international units is subsidiary to the list of units article and lists widely used modern units in a form of sortable table.

Unit system	Domain	Derivation	Unit name	Unit symbol	Dimension symbol	Quantity name	Definition	In SI base units	In other SI units									
Unit system	Domain	Derivation	Unit name	Unit symbol	Dimension symbol	Quantity name	Definition	In SI base units	In other SI units	SI	Physics	Basic	second (Note: Within the context of the SI, the second is the coherent base unit of time, and is used in the definitions of derived units. The name "second" historically arose as being the 2nd-level sexagesimal division (1/60^{2}) of some quantity, the hour in this case, which the SI classifies as an "accepted" unit along with its first-level sexagesimal division the minute.)	s	T	time	The duration of 9192631770 periods of the radiation corresponding to the transition between the two hyperfine levels of the ground state of the caesium-133 atom.	s
SI	Physics	Basic	metre	m	L	length	The distance travelled by light in vacuum in 1/299792458 second.	m										
SI	Physics	Basic	kilogram (Note: Despite the prefix "kilo-", the kilogram is the coherent base unit of mass, and is used in the definitions of derived units. Nonetheless, prefixes for the unit of mass are determined as if the gram were the base unit.)	kg	M	mass	The kilogram is defined by setting the Planck constant h exactly to 6.62607015×10^{−34} J⋅s (J = kg⋅m^{2}⋅s^{−2}), given the definitions of the metre and the second.	kg										
SI	Physics	Basic	ampere	A	I	electric current	The flow of exactly 1/(1.602176634×10^{−19}) times the elementary charge e per second. Equalling approximately 6.2415090744×10^{18} elementary charges per second.	A										
SI	Physics	Basic	kelvin	K	Θ	thermodynamic temperature	The kelvin is defined by setting the fixed numerical value of the Boltzmann constant k to 1.380649×10^{−23} J⋅K^{−1}, (J = kg⋅m^{2}⋅s^{−2}), given the definition of the kilogram, the metre, and the second.	K										
SI	Physics	Basic	mole	mol	N	amount of substance	The amount of substance of exactly 6.02214076×10^{23} elementary entities. (Note: When the mole is used, the elementary entities must be specified and may be atoms, molecules, ions, electrons, other particles, or specified groups of such particles.) This number is the fixed numerical value of the Avogadro constant, N_{A}, when expressed in the unit mol^{−1}.	mol										
SI	Physics	Basic	candela	cd	J	luminous intensity	The luminous intensity, in a given direction, of a source that emits monochromatic radiation of frequency 5.4×10^{14} hertz and that has a radiant intensity in that direction of 1/683 watt per steradian.	cd										
SI	Physics	Relational	radian (Note: The radian and steradian are defined as dimensionless derived units.)	rad		plane angle		m/m	1									
SI	Physics	Relational	steradian	sr		solid angle		m^{2}/m^{2}	1									
SI	Physics	Relational	hertz	Hz		frequency		s^{−1}										
SI	Physics	Relational	newton	N		force		kg⋅m⋅s^{−2}										
SI	Physics	Relational	pascal	Pa		pressure		kg⋅m^{−1}⋅s^{−2}	N/m^{2}									
SI	Physics	Relational	joule	J		energy, work, heat		kg⋅m^{2}⋅s^{−2}	N⋅m = Pa⋅m^{3}									
SI	Physics	Relational	watt	W		power, radiant flux		kg⋅m^{2}⋅s^{−3}	J/s									
SI	Physics	Relational	coulomb	C		electric charge		s⋅A										
SI	Physics	Relational	volt	V		electrical potential difference (voltage), emf		kg⋅m^{2}⋅s^{−3}⋅A^{−1}	W/A = J/C									
SI	Physics	Relational	farad	F		capacitance		kg^{−1}⋅m^{−2}⋅s^{4}⋅A^{2}	C/V									
SI	Physics	Relational	ohm	Ω		resistance, impedance, reactance		kg⋅m^{2}⋅s^{−3}⋅A^{−2}	V/A									
SI	Physics	Relational	siemens	S		electrical conductance		kg^{−1}⋅m^{−2}⋅s^{3}⋅A^{2}	Ω^{−1}									
SI	Physics	Relational	weber	Wb		magnetic flux		kg⋅m^{2}⋅s^{−2}⋅A^{−1}	V⋅s									
SI	Physics	Relational	tesla	T		magnetic flux density		kg⋅s^{−2}⋅A^{−1}	Wb/m^{2}									
SI	Physics	Relational	henry	H		inductance		kg⋅m^{2}⋅s^{−2}⋅A^{−2}	Wb/A									
SI	Physics	Relational	degree Celsius	°C		temperature relative to 273.15 K		K										
SI	Physics	Relational	lumen	lm		luminous flux		cd⋅sr										
SI	Physics	Relational	lux	lx		illuminance		cd⋅sr⋅m^{−2}	lm/m^{2}									
SI	Physics	Relational	becquerel	Bq		radioactivity (decays per unit time)		s^{−1}										
SI	Physics	Relational	gray	Gy		absorbed dose (of ionising radiation)		m^{2}⋅s^{−2}	J/kg									
SI	Physics	Relational	sievert	Sv		equivalent dose (of ionising radiation)		m^{2}⋅s^{−2}	J/kg									
SI	Physics	Relational	katal	kat		catalytic activity		mol⋅s^{−1}										
SI	Physics	Dimensional	square metre	m^{2}	A	area												
SI	Physics	Dimensional	cubic metre	m^{3}	V	volume												
SI	Physics	Relational	metre per second	m/s	v	speed, velocity												
SI	Physics	Relational	metre per second squared	m/s^{2}	a	acceleration												
SI	Physics	Relational	reciprocal metre	m^{−1}	σ, ṽ or in optics V, 1/f	wavenumber, vergence (optics)												
SI	Physics	Relational	kilogram per cubic metre	kg/m^{3}	ρ	density												
SI	Physics	Relational	kilogram per square metre	kg/m^{2}	ρ_{A}	surface density												
SI	Physics	Relational	cubic metre per kilogram	m^{3}/kg	v	specific volume												
SI	Physics	Relational	ampere per square metre	A/m^{2}	j	current density												
SI	Physics	Relational	ampere per metre	A/m	H	magnetic field strength												
SI	Physics	Relational	mole per cubic metre	mol/m^{3}	c	concentration												
SI	Physics	Relational	kilogram per cubic metre	kg/m^{3}	ρ, γ	mass concentration												
SI	Physics	Relational	candela per square metre	cd/m^{2}	L_{v}	luminance												
?	Economics	Relational				velocity of money												
?	Economics	Relational				gross margin												
