= Gas collecting tube =

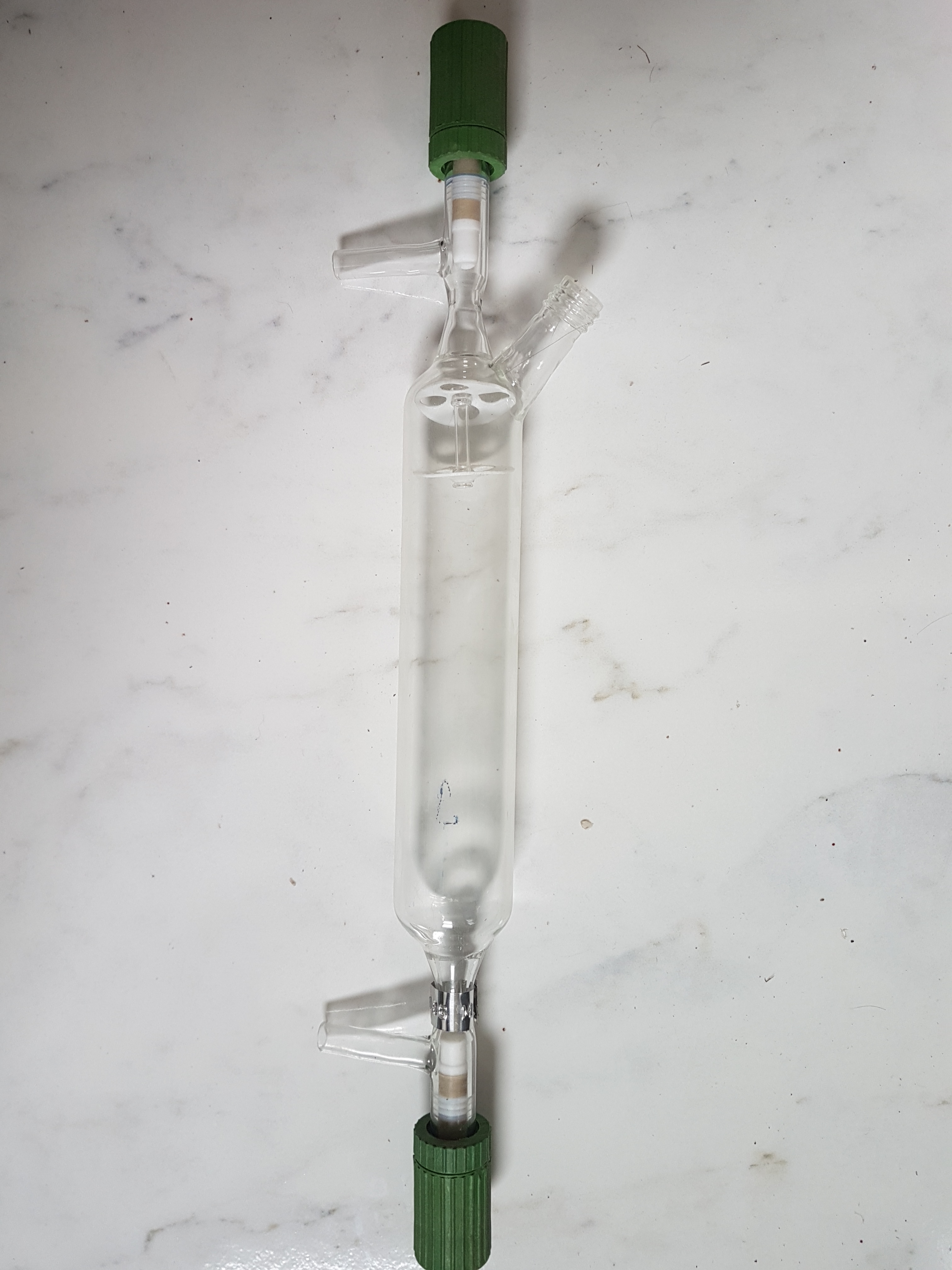
A double-ended gas collecting tube

The characterization gas collecting tube describes an oblong gas-tight container with one valve at either end. Usually such a container has a gauged volume, has a cylindrical shape and is made of glass. Gas collecting tubes are used for science-related purposes; for taking samples of gases.

== Versions ==
- Gas collecting tubes, made of glass, with 2 stopcocks with glass plugs, without septum
- as above, with septum
- with PTFE plug, without septum
- as above, with septum
