= Inkometer =

Instrument for measuring the adhesiveness of ink

An inkometer is a specialized measuring instrument used by the printing industry to measure the "tack" (adhesiveness) of an ink with the roller system on an offset press. The importance of tack is that it is not so excessive that it doesn't allow effective transfer from the rollers to the plate and then to the blanket and onto the substrate being printed. Inks can also be tack "graded" in descending sequence to allow for better trapping of one color over another. Inks with too much tack can cause the surface of the paper to pick off and interfere with transfer on subsequent printing units and copies.

The amount of tack can be controlled by changing the amount of solvent or other diluent used in the ink. The inkometer is made up of three rollers. The center roller is a temperature controlled brass roller, the bottom roller is an oscillating rubber distribution roller. The top roller is attached to a load cell which measures the tack at a given press speed (i.e. 800 feet per minute for a web press or 15000 sheets per hour for an offset press)
