= Bettsometer =

Measurement instrument

A Bettsometer is a fabric degradation tester commonly used to measure or test the integrity of fabric coverings (and associated stitching) on aircraft and their wings.

== Overview ==
The Bettsometer comprises a pen-like instrument (which functions much like a spring balance) and a smooth round needle or pin. The needle is inserted into the fabric and then the instrument is pulled to exert a specific force on the fabric in order to test. A visual inspection is made to check for any rips or tears at the needle insertion point.

== Application ==
The Bettsometer test is often a requirement for the annual 'permit' renewal and is usually carried out by an aircraft inspector who will know the requirements of the test (i.e. the areas of sail and stitching to be tested and the force to be exerted).

== See also ==
- Acoustic rheometer
