= Grindometer =

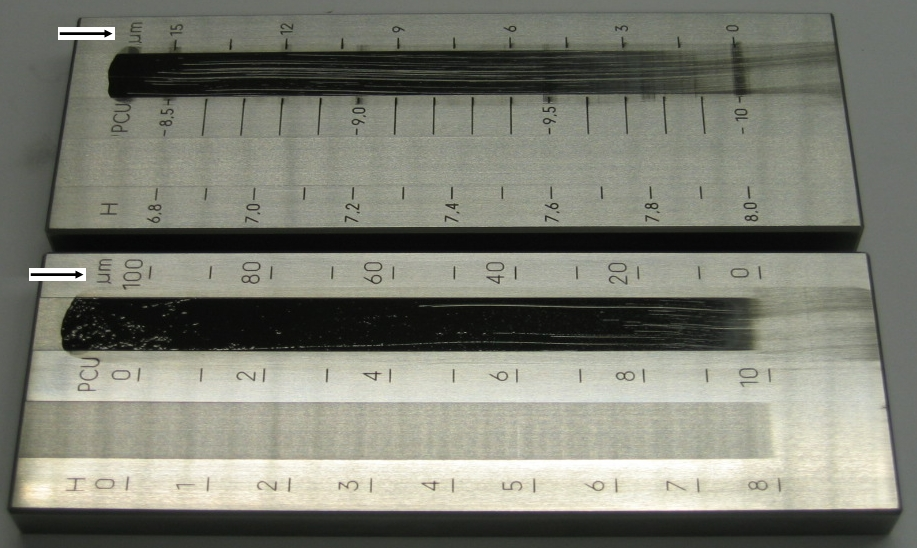
Two grindometers, one for 0 to 15 μm and one for 0 to 100 μm

A grindometer is a device used to measure the particle size of suspensions, typically inks such as those used in printing, or paints. It consists of a steel block with a channel of varying depth machined into it, starting at a convenient depth for the type of suspension to be measured, and becoming shallower until it ends flush with the block's surface. The depth of the groove is marked off on a graduated scale next to it. The suspension to be tested is poured into the deep end of the groove, and scraped towards the shallow end with a flat metal scraper. At the point where the depth of the groove equals the largest particles in the suspension, irregularities (for example pinholes in an ink sample) will become visible.

The advantages of this method are that it uses a small sample and gives a very quick indication of the high end of the particle size distribution, allowing production processes to be followed in real time.

The following standards are relevant on conjunction with the use of grindometers: ASTM D 1210, ASTM D 1316, JIS K 5600-2-5, ISO 1524, EN ISO 1524, BS 3900-C6
