= Universal measuring machine =

Type of measurement device

Universal measuring machines (UMM) are measurement devices used for objects in which geometric relationships are the most critical element, with dimensions specified from geometric locations (see GD&T) rather than absolute coordinates. The very first uses for these machines was the inspection of gauges and parts produced by jig grinding. While bearing some resemblance to a coordinate-measuring machine (CMM), its usage and accuracy envelope differs significantly. While CMMs typically move in three dimensions and measure with a touch probe, a UMM aligns a spindle (4th axis) with a part geometry using a continuous scanning probe.

Originally, universal measuring machines were created to fill a need to continuously measure geometric features in both an absolute and comparative capacity, rather than by a point based coordinate measuring system. A CMM provides a rapid method for inspecting absolute points, but geometric relationships, such as runout, parallelism, perpendicularity, etc., must be calculated rather than measured directly. By aligning an accurate spindle with an electronic test indicator with a geometric feature of interest, rather than using a non-scanning cartesian probe to estimate an alignment, a universal measuring machine fills this need. The indicator can be accurately controlled and moved across a part, either along a linear axis or radially around the spindle, to continuously record profile and determine geometry. This gives the universal machine a very strong advantage over non-scanning measuring methods when profiling flats, radii, contours, and holes, as the detail of the feature can be at the resolution of the probe. More modern CMMs do have scanning probes and thus can determine geometry similarly.

In practice, the 1970s-era universal measuring machine is a very slow machine that requires a highly skilled and patient operator to use, and the accuracy built into these machines far outstripped the needs of most industries. As a result, the universal measuring machine today is uncommon, only found as a special-purpose machine in metrology laboratories. Because the machine can make comparative length measurements without moving linear axes, it is a valuable tool in comparing master gauges and length standards. While universal measuring machines were never a mass-produced item, they are no longer available on a production basis, and are produced on a to-order basis tailored to the needs of the metrology lab purchasing it. Manufacturers that perform work that must be measured on such a machine will frequently opt to subcontract the measurement to a laboratory which specializes in it.

Universal measuring machines placed under corrected interferometric control and using non-contact gauge heads can measure features to millionths of an inch across the machine's entire envelope, where other types of machine are limited either in number of axes or accuracy of the measurement. The accuracy of the machine itself is negligible, as the environment the machine is the limiting factor to effective accuracy. The earlier mechanical machines were built to hold 10 to 20 millionths of an inch accuracy across the entire machine envelope.
