= Abrasion (mechanical) =

Process of wearing down a surface

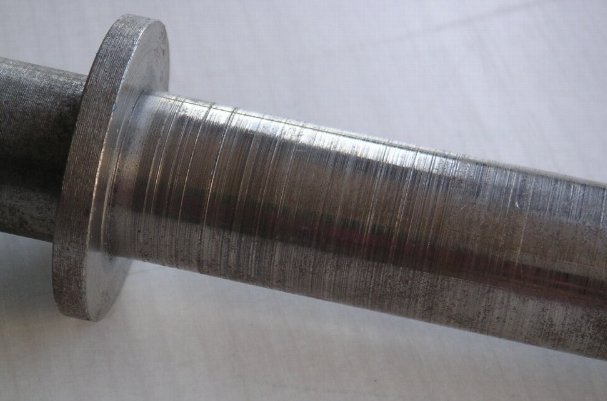
Surface roughness resulting from abrasion wear on a spindle.

Abrasion is the process of scuffing, scratching, wearing down, marring, or rubbing away. It can be intentionally imposed in a controlled process using an abrasive. Abrasion can be an undesirable effect of exposure to normal use or exposure to the elements.

== In stone shaping ==
Ancient artists, working in stone, used abrasion to create sculptures. The artist selected dense stones like carbonite and emery and rubbed them consistently against comparatively softer stones like limestone and granite. The artist used different sizes and shapes of abrasives, or turned them in various ways as they rubbed, to create effects on the softer stone's surface. Water was continuously poured over the surface to carry away particles. Abrasive technique in stone shaping was a long, tedious process that, with patience, resulted in eternal works of art in stone.

== Models ==
The Archard equation is a simple model used to describe sliding wear and is based on the theory of asperity contact.

$$Q = \frac {KWL}H$$

where:

Q is the total volume of wear debris produced
K is the wear coefficient
W is the total normal load
L is the sliding distance
H is the hardness of the softest contacting surfaces

K is obtained from experimental results and depends on several parameters. Among them are surface quality, chemical affinity between the material of two surfaces, surface hardness process, heat transfer between two surfaces and others.

== Abrasion resistance ==
The resistance of materials and structures to abrasion can be measured by a variety of test methods. These often use a specified abrasive or other controlled means of abrasion. Under the conditions of the test, the results can be reported or can be compared items subjected to similar tests.

Such standardized measurements can produce two quantities: abrasion rate and normalized abrasion rate (also called abrasion resistance index). The former is the amount of mass lost per 1000 cycles of abrasion. The latter is the ratio of former with the known abrasion rate for some specific reference material.

One type of instrument used to get the abrasion rate and normalized abrasion rate is the abrasion scrub tester, which is made up of a mechanical arm, liquid pump, and programmable electronics. The machine draws the mechanical arm with attached brush (or sandpaper, sponge, etc.) over the surface of the material that is being tested. The operator sets a pre-programmed number of passes for a repeatable and controlled result. The liquid pump can provide detergent or other liquids to the mechanical arm during testing to simulate washing and other normal uses.

=== Dry Sand / Rubber Wheel (ASTM G65) test ===
Another example is the ASTM G65 test using dry sand with a rubber wheel for abrasion testing. This widely used test can evaluate coatings and materials for comparison of their resistance. G65 is often used for The ASTM G65 standard – “Standard Test Method for Measuring Abrasion Using the Dry Sand/Rubber Wheel Apparatus” – is one of the most widely used laboratory procedures for evaluating the abrasion resistance of metallic materials and coatings. In this test, a rubber wheel is rotated against a flat specimen while a controlled flow of silica sand is introduced between the wheel and the test surface, producing a three-body abrasion condition that simulates sliding wear in service.

Material volume loss is determined by weight loss and reported as a wear rate (typically in mm³ or mm³/kg of abrasive). Test parameters such as wheel load, abrasive feed rate, and rubber hardness are defined in five test procedures (A–E) within ASTM G65. The method is particularly useful for ranking steels, weld overlays, and wear-resistant coatings used in mining, drilling, and agricultural equipment.

Similar abrasion tests include the ASTM G105 “Wet Sand/Rubber Wheel” method and the Taber abrasion test used for polymeric and coated surfaces.

The use of proper lubricants can help control abrasion in some instances. Some items can be covered with an abrasion-resistant material. Controlling the cause of abrasion is sometimes an option.

== Standards ==
=== ASTM ===
- ASTM B611 Test Method for Abrasive Wear Resistance of Cemented Carbides
- ASTM C131 Standard Test Method for Resistance to Degradation of Small-Size Coarse Aggregate by Abrasion and Impact in the Los Angeles Machine
- ASTM C448 Standard Test Methods for Abrasion Resistance of Porcelain Enamels
- ASTM C535 Standard Test Method for Resistance to Degradation of Large-Size Coarse Aggregate by Abrasion and Impact in the Los Angeles Machine
- ASTM C944 Standard Test Method for Abrasion Resistance of Concrete or Mortar Surfaces by the Rotating-Cutter Method
- ASTM C1027 Standard Test Method for Determining Visible Abrasion Resistance of Glazed Ceramic Tile
- ASTM C1353 Standard Test Method for Abrasion Resistance of Dimension Stone Subjected to Foot Traffic Using a Rotary Platform, Double-Head Abraser
- ASTM D968 Standard Test Methods for Abrasion Resistance of Organic Coatings by Falling Abrasive
- ASTM D1630 Standard Test Method for Rubber Property — Abrasion Resistance (Footwear Abrader)
- ASTM D2228 Standard Test Method for Rubber Property - Relative Abrasion Resistance by the Pico Abrader Method
- ASTM D3389 Standard Test Method for Coated Fabrics Abrasion Resistance (Rotary Platform Abrader)
- ASTM D4060 Standard Test Method for Abrasion Resistance of Organic Coatings by the Taber Abraser
- ASTM D4158 Standard Guide for Abrasion Resistance of Textile Fabrics],
- ASTM D4966 Standard Test Method for Abrasion Resistance of Textile Fabrics
- ASTM D5181 Standard Test Method for Abrasion Resistance of Printed Matter by the GA-CAT Comprehensive Abrasion Tester
- ASTM D5264 Standard Practice for Abrasion Resistance of Printed Materials by the Sutherland Rub Tester
- ASTM D5963 Standard Test Method for Rubber Property—Abrasion Resistance (Rotary Drum Abrader)
- ASTM D6279 Standard Test Method for Rub Abrasion Mar Resistance of High Gloss Coatings
- ASTM D7027 Standard Test Method for Evaluation of Scratch Resistance of Polymeric Coatings and Plastics Using an Instrumented Scratch Machine
- ASTM D7428 Standard Test Method for Resistance of Fine Aggregate to Degradation by Abrasion in the Micro-Deval Apparatus
- ASTM F1486 Standard Practice for Determination of Abrasion and Smudge Resistance of Images Produced from Office Products
- ASTM F1978 Standard Test Method for Measuring Abrasion Resistance of Metallic Thermal Spray Coatings by Using the Taber Abraser
- ASTM G56 Standard Test Method for Abrasiveness of Ink-Impregnated Fabric Printer Ribbons and Other Web Materials
- ASTM G65 Standard Test Method for Measuring Abrasion Using the Dry Sand/Rubber Wheel Apparatus
- ASTM G75 Standard Test Method for Determination of Slurry Abrasivity (Miller Number) and Slurry Abrasion Response of Materials (SAR Number)
- ASTM G81 Standard Test Method for Jaw Crusher Gouging Abrasion Test
- ASTM G99 Standard Test Method for Wear Testing with a Pin-on-Disk Apparatus
- ASTM G105 Standard Test Method for Conducting Wet Sand/Rubber Wheel Abrasion Tests
- ASTM G132 Standard Test Method for Pin Abrasion Testing
- ASTM G171 Standard Test Method for Scratch Hardness of Materials Using a Diamond Stylus
- ASTM G174 Standard Test Method for Measuring Abrasion Resistance of Materials by Abrasive Loop Contact

=== DIN ===
- DIN 53516 Testing of Rubber and Elastomers; Determination of Abrasion Resistance

=== ISO ===
- ISO 4649 Rubber, vulcanized or thermoplastic -- Determination of abrasion resistance using a rotating cylindrical drum device
- ISO 9352 Plastics -- Determination of resistance to wear by abrasive wheels
- ISO 28080 Hardmetals -- Abrasion tests for hardmetals
- ISO 23794 Rubber, vulcanized or thermoplastic -- Abrasion testing -- Guidance
- ISO 21988:2006 Abrasion-resistant cast irons. Classification
- ISO 28080:2011 Hardmetals. Abrasion tests for hardmetals
- ISO 16282:2008 Methods of test for dense shaped refractory products. Determination of resistance to abrasion at ambient temperature

=== JSA ===
- JIS A 1121 Method of test for resistance to abrasion of coarse aggregate by use of the Los Angeles machine
- JIS A 1452 Method of abrasion test for building materials and part of building construction (falling sand method)
- JIS A 1453 Method of abrasion test for building materials and part of building construction (abrasive-paper method)
- JIS A 1509-5 Test methods for ceramic tiles -- Part 5: Determination of resistance to deep abrasion for unglazed floor tiles
- JIS A 1509-6 Test methods for ceramic tiles -- Part 6: Determination of resistance to surface abrasion for glazed floor tiles
- JIS C 60068-2 Environmental testing -- Part 2: Tests -- Test Xb: Abrasion of markings and letterings caused by rubbing of fingers and hands
- JIS H 8682-1 Test methods for abrasion resistance of anodic oxide coatings on aluminium and aluminium alloys -- Part 1: Wheel wear test
- JIS H 8682-2 Test methods for abrasion resistance of anodic oxide coatings on aluminium and aluminium alloys -- Part 2: Abrasive jet test
- JIS H 8682-3 Test methods for abrasion resistance of anodic oxide coatings on aluminium and aluminium alloys -- Part 3: Sand-falling abrasion resistance test
- JIS K 5600-5-8 Testing methods for paints -- Part 5: Mechanical property of film -- Section 8: Abrasion resistance (Rotating abrasive-paper-covered wheel method)
- JIS K 7204 Plastics -- Determination of resistance to wear by abrasive wheels

== See also ==
- Abrasion (geology) – Process of erosion
- Abrasive – Rough material used to shape or finish objects by friction
- Abrasive blasting – Method of marking or cleaning a surface
- Archard equation – Model used to describe wear
- Erosion – Natural processes removing soil and rock
- Wear – Damaging, gradual removal or deformation of material at solid surfaces
