= John F. Archard =

British engineer and tribologist, known for wear studies

John Frederick Archard (1918–1989) was a British engineer known for his wear studies.

== Career ==
Archard went to the Worthing High School for Boys before he entered the University College of Southampton. Afterwards, he served six years in the Royal Air Force (RAF), including at the headquarters of Coastal Command. As a member of the RAF radar staff, he also made a trip to Washington.

In 1946, he returned to Southampton for postgraduate research in optics.

Starting in 1949 he worked in the surface physics section of the Associated Electrical Industries Research Laboratory, where he investigated the lubrication of heavily loaded contacts.

In the 1950s he developed an analytical model used to describe abrasive wear based on the theory of contact of asperities, which became known in the literature as wear equation or Archard equation.

Archard was a reader at Leicester University until his retirement in the early 1980s. He ran a successful experimental tribology research program.

He was a Fellow of the Physical Society and of the Institute of Physics.

In 1989 he received the Mayo D. Hersey Award for his scientific contributions in the field of tribology.

== Private life ==
Archard lived in Tilehurst, was married and had two sons.

== See also ==
- Archard wear equation
