= Coefficient (disambiguation) =

Coefficient could have one of the following meanings:

== Mathematics ==
- A coefficient is a constant multiplication of a function.
- The term differential coefficient has been mostly displaced by the modern term derivative.

== Computing ==
- In computer arithmetics, the term coefficient (floating point number) is also sometimes used as a synonym for mantissa or significand.

== Probability theory and statistics ==
- The coefficient of determination, denoted R^{2} and pronounced R squared, is the proportion of total variation of outcomes explained by a statistical model.
- The coefficient of variation (CV) is a normalized measure of dispersion of a probability distribution or frequency distribution.
- The correlation coefficient (Pearson's r) is a measure of the linear correlation (dependence) between two variables.

== Science ==
- In physics, a physical coefficient is an important number that characterizes some physical property of an object.
- In chemistry, a stoichiometric coefficient is a number placed in front of a term in a chemical equation to indicate how many molecules (or atoms) take part in the reaction.

== Other ==
- UEFA coefficient, used by the governing body for association football in Europe to calculate ranking points for its member clubs and national federations
- The Coefficients were an Edwardian London dining club.
