= Ragnar Holm =

Swedish physicist (1879–1970)

Ragnar Holm (born 6 May 1879 in Skara, Sweden, died on 27 February 1970 at St. Marys, Pennsylvania, USA), was a Swedish physicist and researcher in electrical engineering, who was partially active in Germany and the United States.

== Career ==
In 1904, Holm became licentiate in philosophy (PhL) at Uppsala University, and earned his PhD in 1908. From 1906 to 1908 he studied at the University of Göttingen in Germany. In 1908 to 1909 he was a lecturer in Stockholm. Between 1909 and 1919 he worked as a physicist for Siemens & Halske in Berlin. In 1919 to 1921 he was a physicist and teacher at the Telegraphic Education Center in Stockholm, and between 1921 and 1927 associate professor at the Technical High School in Örebro. Between 1927 and 1945 he worked again for Siemens & Halske. From 1947 he was a consulting physicist at Stackpole Carbon Company in St. Marys, Pennsylvania.

== Research ==
Holm's research area included the study of electrical discharges, but his main focus was on electrical contacts, where he was a world-leading authority. His book Electric Contacts, originally published in 1946, is still used as a standard work in the field (in its fourth edition of 1967).

He also made significant contributions to the field of tribology, specifically predicting wear.

The Swedish Library of the Royal Institute of Technology (KTHB) maintains a special literature collection (Holm Collection) related to Ragnar Holm's research.

With Walther Meissner, he published a seminal work in 1932 on contacts between superconductors and normal conductors. This led to the discovery of the proximity effect, sometimes known as the Holm–Meissner effect. This discovery led to the invalidation of Albert Einstein model for superconductivity.

== Awards ==
In 1963, Holm received the International Award from the Society of Tribologists and Lubrication Engineers. In 1968, he was awarded the Mayo D. Hersey Award from the American Society of Mechanical Engineers.

== Death and legacy ==
Holm died on 27 February 1970 at his home in St. Marys, Pennsylvania. His funeral was held in Sweden at Skara Cathedral on the 14 August 1970 where his ashes were interred. An obituary to Holm was published in Physics Today (American Institute of Physics). In 1971, the year after Holm's death, the IEEE established the Ragnar Holm Scientific Achievement Award ("Ragnar Holm Award") for efforts in the field of electrical contacts. The prize has been awarded annually since 1972.

Since 1999, the Swedish Royal Institute of Technology (KTH) has distributed the Ragnar Holm plaque to a young physicist at the beginning of the research career, after assessing dissertations and articles in physics, primarily related to Holm's previous research on electrical contacts. Every second year, the plaque is awarded to a Swedish recipient, and every two years the selection is international.

== See also ==
- Archard wear equation
