= Wear coefficient =

The wear coefficient is a physical coefficient used to measure, characterize and correlate the wear of materials.

== Background ==
Traditionally, the wear of materials has been characterized by weight loss and wear rate. However, studies have found that wear coefficient is more suitable. The reason being that it takes the wear rate, the applied load, and the hardness of the wear pin into account. Although, measurement variations by an order of 10-1 have been observed, the variations can be minimized if suitable precautions are taken.

A wear volume versus distance curve can be divided into at least two regimes, the transient wear regime and the steady-state wear regime. The volume or weight loss is initially curvilinear. The wear rate per unit sliding distance in the transient wear regime decreases until it has reached a constant value in the steady-state wear regime. Hence the standard wear coefficient value obtained from a volume loss versus distance curve is a function of the sliding distance.

== Measurement ==
Table 1: K values for various materials
| Material | K |
|---|---|
| Polythene | 1.3×10^{−7} |
| PMMA | 7×10^{−6} |
| Ferritic stainless steel | 1.7×10^{−5} |
| PTFE | 2.5×10^{−5} |
| Copper-beryllium | 3.7×10^{−5} |
| Hard tool steel | 1.3×10^{−4} |
| α- / β-brass (Note: Cu/Zn with 30-45% Zn) | 6×10^{−4} |
| Mild steel (on mild steel) | 7×10^{−3} |

The steady-state wear equation was proposed as:

$V = K \frac{P L}{3 H}$

where $H$ is the Brinell hardness expressed as Pascals, $V$ is the volumetric loss, $P$ is the normal load, and $L$ is the sliding distance. $K$ is the dimensionless standard wear coefficient.

As an example, for two mild steel surfaces, the Brinell hardness number $HB$ is 120, and the dimension of Brinell hardness number is in $\frac{kgf}{mm^2}$. Expressing this in Pascals is $9.8*10^6$ times as large, which is $1.176*10^9$Pascals. If these surfaces slide over each other over a length of 1 meter, and the top is loaded with 1 kg (yielding a force of 9.8 Newtons), and with a $K$ value of $7*10^{-3}$ (from table on the right of this text), then the volume of steel removed is: $V = 7*{-3} * 9.8 * \frac{1/3}{1.176*10^9} = (1.94*10^{-11}) m^3 = 0.019 mm^3$.

In general, the wear coefficient $K$ in the abrasive model is defined as:

$K = \frac{3 H V}{P L}$

As $V$ can be estimated from weight loss $W$ and the density $\rho$, the wear coefficient can also be expressed as:

$K = \frac{3 H W}{P L \rho}$

As the standard method uses the total volume loss and the total sliding distance, there is a need to define the net steady-state wear coefficient:

$K_N = \frac{3 H V_s}{P L_s}$

where $L_s$ is the steady-state sliding distance, and $V_s$ is the steady-state wear volume.

With regard to the sliding wear model K can be expressed as:

$K = \frac{V}{A_p L}$

where $A_p$ is the plastically deformed zone.

If the coefficient of friction is defined as:

$\mu = \frac{F_t}{P}$

where $F_t$ is the tangential force. Then K can be defined for abrasive wear as work done to create abrasive wear particles by cutting $V u$ to external work done $F L$:

$K = \frac{3 \mu H V}{\mu P L} = 3 \mu \frac{V u}{F L} \approx \frac{V u}{F L}$

In an experimental situation the hardness of the uppermost layer of material in the contact may not be known with any certainty, consequently, the ratio $\frac{K}{H}$ is more useful; this is known as the dimensional wear coefficient or the specific wear rate. This is usually quoted in units of mm^{3} N^{−1} m^{−1}.

=== Composite material ===
As metal matrix composite (MMC) materials have become to be used more often due to their better physical, mechanical and tribological properties compared to matrix materials it is necessary to adjust the equation.

The proposed equation is:

$K = \frac{3 g_1 d (1 - f_v)}{g_3 f_v L} \left[ 1 - exp \left( \frac{-g_3 f_v L}{d (1 - f_v)} \right) \right]$

where $g_3$ is a function of the average particle diameter $d$, $f_v$ is the volume fraction of particles. $g_1$ is a function of the applied load $P$, the pin hardness $H$ and the gradient $m_A$ of the $V_c$ curve at $L = 0$.

$g_1 = \frac{H m_A}{P}$

Therefore, the effects of load and pin hardness can be shown:

$K = \frac{3 H m_A d (1 - f_v)}{P L g_3 f_v L} \left[ 1 - exp \left( \frac{-g_3 f_v L}{d (1 - f_v)} \right) \right]$

As wear testing is a time-consuming process, it was shown to be possible to save time by using a predictable method.

== See also ==
- wear rate
- weight loss
