= Oil analysis =

Laboratory analysis of an oil based lubricant's properties and contaminants

Oil analysis (OA) is the laboratory analysis of a lubricant's properties, suspended contaminants, and wear debris. OA is performed during routine predictive maintenance to provide meaningful and accurate information on lubricant and machine condition. By tracking oil analysis sample results over the life of a particular machine, trends can be established which can help eliminate costly repairs. The study of wear in machinery is called tribology. Tribologists often perform or interpret oil analysis data.

OA can be divided into three categories:

1. analysis of oil properties including those of the base oil and its additives,
2. analysis of contaminants,
3. analysis of wear debris from machinery,

== Oil sampling ==
Oil sampling is a procedure for collecting a volume of fluid from lubricated or hydraulic machinery for the purpose of oil analysis. Much like collecting forensic evidence at a crime scene, when collecting an oil sample, it is important to ensure that procedures are used to minimize disturbance of the sample during and after the sampling process. Oil samples are typically drawn into a small, clean bottle which is sealed and sent to a laboratory for analysis.

== History ==
OA was first used after World War II by the US railroad industry to monitor the health of locomotives. In 1946 the Denver and Rio Grande Railroad's research laboratory successfully detected diesel engine problems through wear metal analysis of used oils. A key factor in their success was the development of the spectrograph, an instrument which replaced several wet chemical methods for detecting and measuring individual chemical element such as iron or copper. This practice was soon accepted and used extensively throughout the railroad industry.

By 1955 OA had matured to the point that the United States Bureau of Naval Weapons began a major research program to adopt wear metal analysis for use in aircraft component failure prediction. These studies formed the basis for a Joint Oil Analysis Program (JOAP) involving all branches of the U.S. Armed Forces. The JOAP results proved conclusively that increases in component wear could be confirmed by detecting corresponding increases in the wear metal content of the lubricating oil. In 1958 Pacific Intermountain Express (P.I.E.) was the first trucking company to set up an in-house used oil analysis laboratory to control vehicle maintenance costs which was managed by Bob Herguth. In 1960 the first independent commercial oil analysis laboratory was started by Edward Forgeron in Oakland, CA.

== Standard practices ==
In addition to monitoring oil contamination and wear metals, modern usage of OA includes the analysis of the additives in oils to determine if an extended drain interval may be used. Maintenance costs can be reduced using OA to determine the remaining useful life of additives in the oil. By comparing the OA results of new and used oil, a tribologist can determine when an oil must be replaced. Careful analysis might even allow the oil to be "sweetened" to its original additive levels by either adding fresh oil or replenishing additives that were depleted.

Oil analysis professionals and analysts can get certified in compliance with ISO standards by passing exams administered by the International Council for Machinery Lubrication (ICML).

For purposes of Oil Analysis Program (OAP) trend analysis, replacement, replenishment or drain and flush of lubricating fluids in excess of half an engine’s oil capacity (2.5 gallons or more) will be considered an Oil Change and the engine will be placed in code Charlie (C) for three flights to establish a new working trend. Oil-Wetted Maintenance (OWM) is any replacement of engine components within an oil-lubricated system (bearings, gearbox, pumps, etc.). OWM actions shall be documented on DD Form 2026 and submitted to OAP lab for update of Oil Analysis database. (a) Special Samples can be requested by the laboratory whenever they feel its necessary. (b) Whenever directed by the unit maintenance activity to investigate suspected deficiencies.

The NDI/JOAP laboratory will set the standards and intervals of oil analysis.

A typical predictive maintenance technique is ferrography, which analyses iron in oil.

== See also ==
- Lubricant – Substance introduced to reduce friction between surfaces in mutual contact
- Lubrication – Presence of a material to reduce friction between two surfaces
- Lubrication theory – Flow of fluids within extremely thin regions
- Mineral oil – Distillate of petroleums
- Oil additive – Chemicals that improve oil performance
- Penetrating oil – Low-viscosity oil
- Tribology – Science of rubbing surfaces
- Viscosity index – Measure of a fluid's viscosity
- Viscometer – Scientific instrument used to measure viscosity
- Fourier-transform_infrared_spectroscopy – Technique to analyze the infrared spectrum of matter
- Particle_counter – Device for monitoring particle contamination
- Ferrography – Method of oil analysis
