= Twist compression tester =

The twist compression tester (TCT) is a hydraulically operated bench-top apparatus used to evaluate the level of friction or wear (or both) between two materials under lubricated or non-lubricated conditions.

Under controlled conditions, a rotating annular specimen is brought into contact with a non-rotating flat specimen. Specimens can be prepared from die materials, sheet or plate materials, metals or plastics.

The applied normal force and the torque are measured, and the coefficient of friction is calculated.

Although the twist-compression test does not simulate an actual process, it has been demonstrated to correlate well with processes where boundary lubrication predominates and lubricant depletion occurs.

The twist compression tester is an invaluable diagnostic tool for: evaluating lubricants, materials and coatings; screening products for production; understanding the effect of additives in a lubricant; and many other value-added testing scenarios.

The twist compression tester was developed by Professor John Schey formerly of the University of Waterloo, and is manufactured, according to his design, under exclusive license by the Industrial Research + Development Institute (Midland, Ontario, Canada). Tribsys is also manufacturing a twist compression machine and other approaches have been used with the Falex MCTT MultiContactTriboTester in thrust-washer configurations.

In addition to twist compression testing, other experimental methods have been developed to evaluate friction behaviour in sheet metal forming processes. For example, strip-drawing tests have been used to investigate the influence of surface topography on the coefficient of friction under controlled contact conditions. Recent studies have demonstrated that machine learning techniques such as Kohonen self-organising maps can be applied to classify friction regimes and to analyse the relationship between surface structure and tribological performance in forming operations.

== See also ==
- Tribometer
