= Ferrography =

Method of oil analysis

Ferrography is a method of oil analysis used to inspect the severity and mechanisms of wear in machinery. This is achieved by separating ferrous debris from lubricating oil by use of a magnetic field with an instrument called a ferrograph, the result is then examined with microscopy. A trained analyst can then diagnose faults or predict failures.

Ferrography is related to tribology, which is the study of friction between interacting surfaces. Since the advent of ferrography in the 1970s it has been used in many industrial settings as a form of predictive maintenance.

== History ==
Ferrography was pioneered in the 1970s by the late Vernon C. Westcott, sponsored by the Advance Research Projects Agency of the United States Department of Defense At the time, the methods used to gauge wear; spectroscopic analysis and ferromagnetic chip detectors, could only provide warning of imminent failure, after the wear had already reached the severity, where preventative maintenance alone would not be an effective control to prevent catastrophic failure. The military reached out to Westcott to find a way to solve this problem and from that Westcott developed the first ferrograph. The ferrograph saw its first practical use, by the British during the Falklands War, where it was used to inspect the condition of helicopter transmissions.

In 1975, Westcott filed a patent that outlined the principles of multiple varieties of ferrography, including microscopic analysis of wear and a quantitative method of on-line ferrography.

In 2009 a new method of visual on-line ferrography was published by a group of researchers from Xi'an Jiaotong University, Theory of Lubrication and Bearing Institute. This is significant as it allows images of wear debris to be obtained during regular machine operation.

== Purpose & Uses ==
Ferrography is a staple in failure prevention maintenance. Continuous monitoring of the lubricating oil allows a change from expensive and often unnecessary preplanned maintenance to more cost-effective failure prevention. Ferrography is unique because it can deliver information about enclosed parts as lubricating oil circulates through these areas and is still accessible. Rinsing vital components with particle-free lubricant and analyzing the output can offer a detailed report of machine wear without disassembling anything.

Since its initial application in the military, ferrography has been found to be helpful in

- ships
- coal mining
- diesel engines
- gas turbines in the aerospace industry
- agricultural industry
- naval aircraft

=== Further applications ===
Applying the idea of ferrography in other fields, techniques have been found to analyze wear outside of lubricating oil and of particles that do not carry magnetic properties. These uses have been found in processing grease samples, gas emissions; and in examining wear on arthritic joints. In arthritic joints, residue from bone-on-bone contact can be found in fluid near the joint and analyzed using direct-reading ferrography which can give information regarding rate of decline in the joint. As of November 2016, minimal information is available regarding further uses of ferrography.

== Types ==
=== Analytical ferrography ===
Analytical ferrography works through magnetic separation of contaminant particles and a professional analysis of the particles. A sample of the machine's lubricating oil is taken and diluted, then run across a glass slide. This glass slide is then placed on a magnetic cylinder that attracts the contaminants. Non-magnetic contaminants remain distributed across the slide from the wash. These contaminants are then washed, to remove excess oil, heated to 600 °F for two minutes, and the slide is analyzed under a microscope. After analysis, the particles will be ranked according to size. Particles over 30 microns in size are considered "abnormal" and indicate severe wear.

Particles are divided into six categories, with an additional five subcategories under ferrous wear:

- copper
- white nonferrous: usually aluminum or chromium
- babbitt: particles containing tin and lead
- contaminants: do not change appearance after heating, usually dirt
- fibers: typically from filters
- ferrous wear: magnetic particles that are attracted to the magnetic cylinder
  - high alloy: rarely found on ferrograms
  - low alloy
  - cast iron
  - dark metallic oxides: darkness indicates oxidation
  - red oxides

Being able to identify different particles can prove to be invaluable because the prominence of certain particles can point to specific locations of wear. Furthermore, the presence of particles that do not make contact with the lubricating oil can uncover contamination. This kind of analysis required a trained professional and can be prohibitively expensive for smaller operations.

=== Direct-reading method ===
Direct-reading ferrography is a more mathematical approach to ferrography. Essentially, the buildup on the glass slide is measured by shining a light across the slide. The blockage of the light by the buildup of particles is then used, over time, to calculate an average. An increase in blockage indicates higher amounts of machine wear. This method is less expensive, as expert analysis is not required, and can be automated. However, once an issue is identified, less information is available to diagnose the problem.

=== On-line visual ferrography ===
On-line visual ferrography (OLVF) allows for images of wear debris to be acquired during routine operation of machinery. It requires attaching an electromagnet, a way to vary the oil flow rate and an image sensor into the oil circuit of the compartment whose oil is being monitored. The ferrous particles in the oil are then deposited in a similar way to using a bench-top ferrograph. Relative wear debris concentration, particle coverage area and images of debris can be obtained from this method.

== Limitations ==
While ferrography is an effective tool for wear analysis, it does come with several limitations. Ferrography is a very expensive procedure because of the specialized and sophisticated instruments required. Ferrography stands out among oil analysis methods because of the magnetic element involved. This allows for a more detailed report that similar methods cannot produce. Additionally, for the qualitative approach which is analytical ferrography, experts are needed to make sense of the raw output. Furthermore, ferrography cannot solve problems, only bring attention to them. These issues then need to be dealt with on their own.

== See also ==
- Condition Monitoring
- Wear
