= Tribometer =

Instrument that measures friction and wear between surfaces

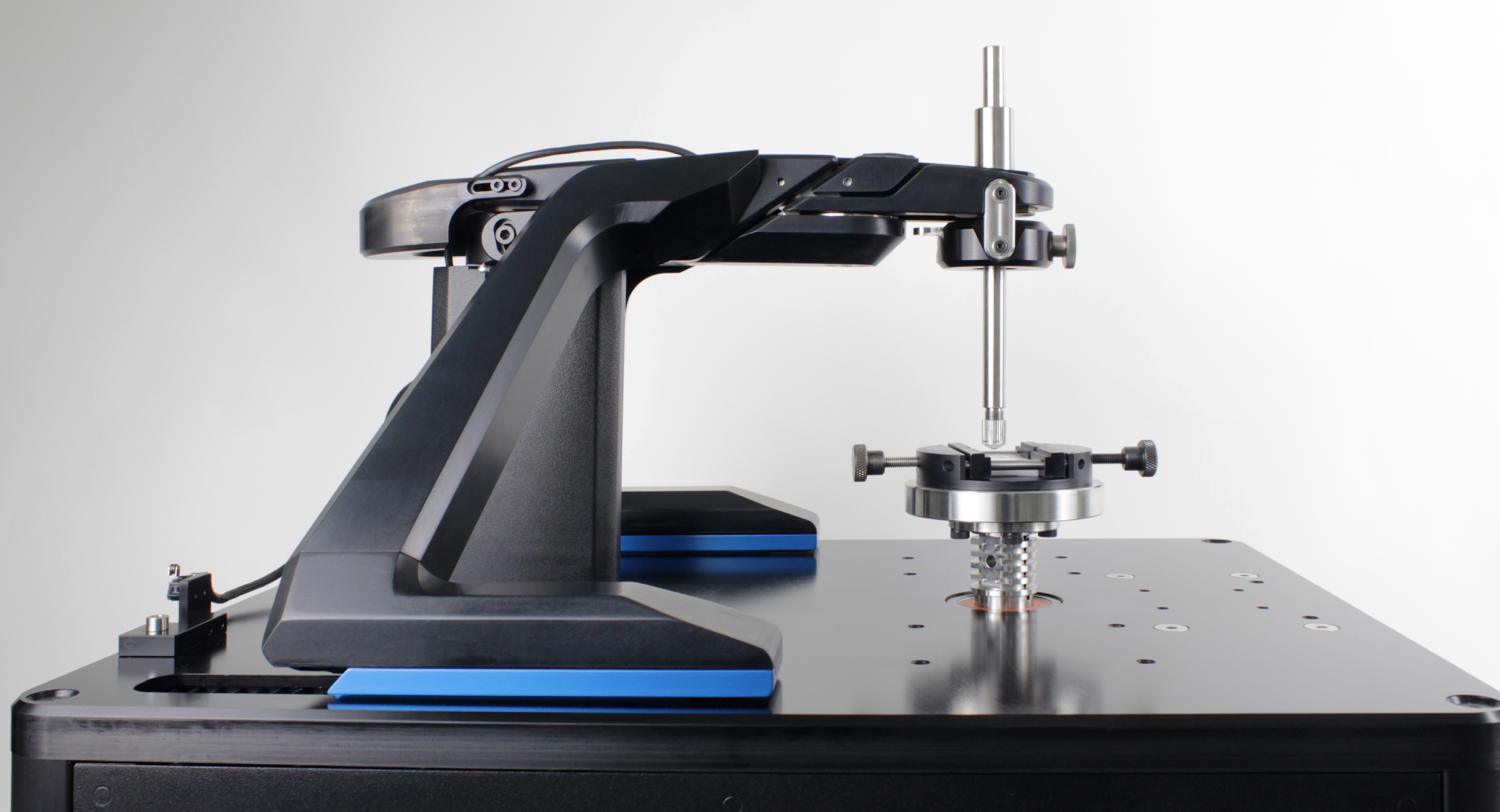
Pneumatic tribometer

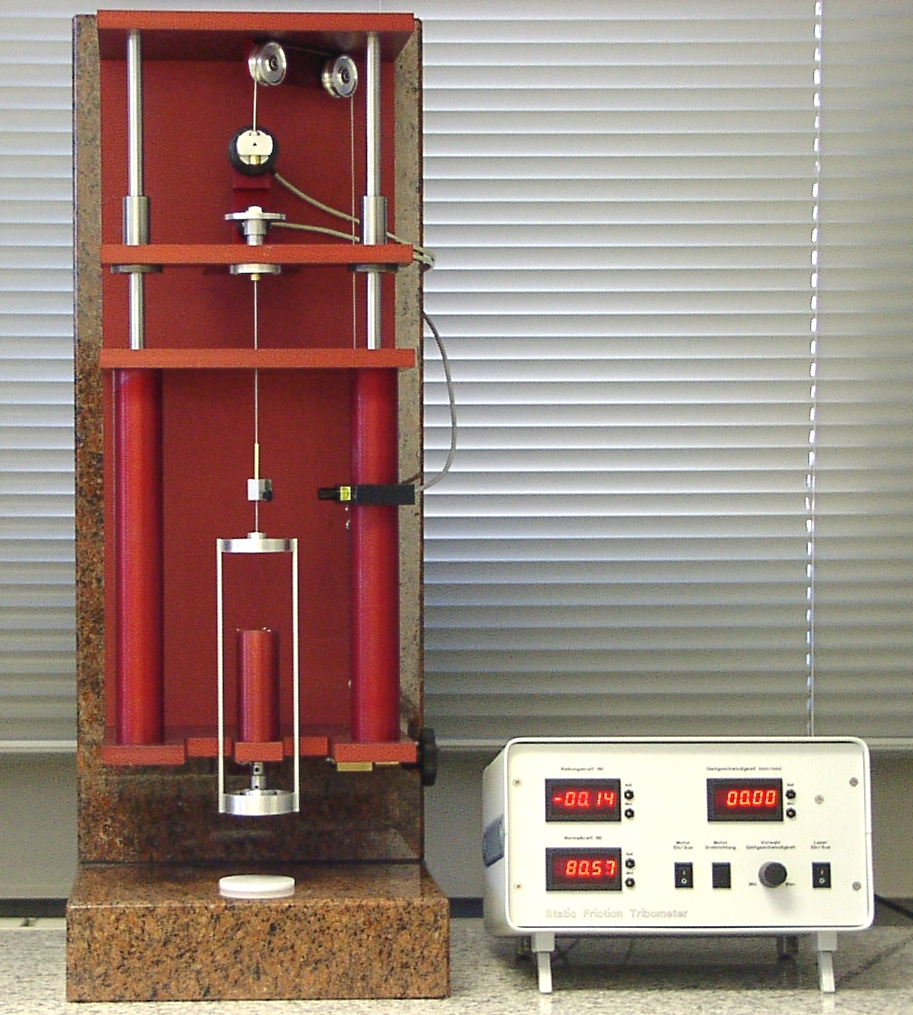
Static-friction tribometer

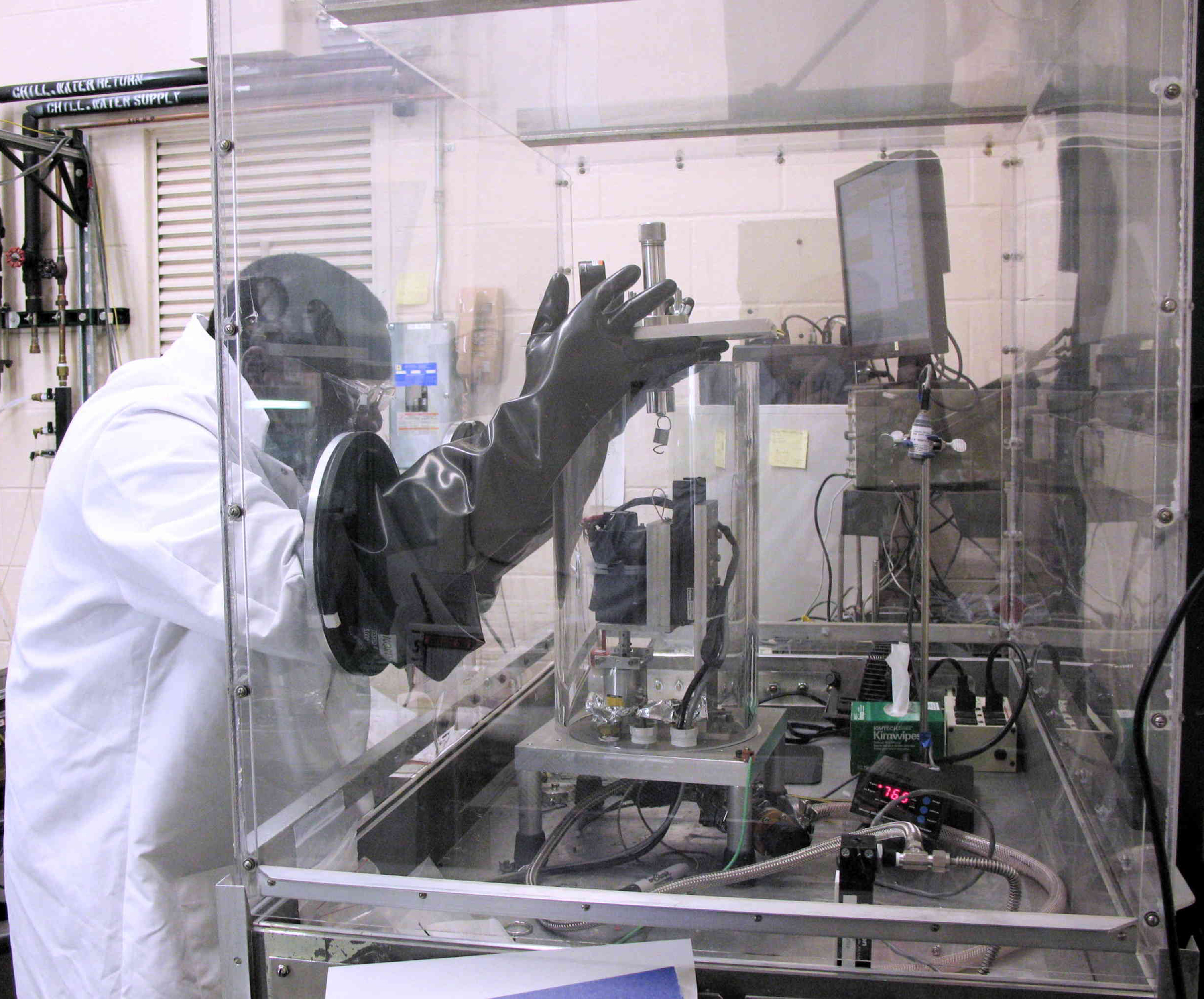
Hydrogen tribometer

A tribometer is an instrument that measures tribological quantities, such as coefficient of friction, friction force, and wear volume, between two surfaces in contact. It was invented by the 18th century Dutch scientist Musschenbroek

Tribotester is the general name given to a machine or device used to perform tests and simulations of wear, friction and lubrication, which are the subject of the study of tribology. Often tribotesters are very specific in their function, fabricated by manufacturers to test and analyze the long-term performance of their products. An example is orthopedic implant manufacturers, who develop tribotesters to accurately reproduce the motions and forces that occur in human hip joints for accelerated wear tests.

== Theory ==

A simple tribometer is described by a hanging mass and a mass resting on a horizontal surface, connected to each other via a string and pulley. The coefficient of friction, μ, when the system is stationary, is determined by increasing the hanging mass until the moment that the resting mass begins to slide. Then using the general equation for friction force:

$$F = \mu N$$

Where N, the normal force, is equal to the weight (mass x gravity) of the sitting mass (m_{T}) and F, the loading force, is equal to the weight (mass x gravity) of the hanging mass (m_{H}).

To determine the kinetic coefficient of friction the hanging mass is increased or decreased until the mass system moves at a constant speed.

In both cases, the coefficient of friction is simplified to the ratio of the two masses:

$$\mu\ = m_H / m_T$$

In most test applications using tribometers, wear is measured by comparing the mass or surfaces of test specimens before and after testing. Equipment and methods used to examine the worn surfaces include optical microscopes, scanning electron microscopes, optical interferometry and mechanical roughness testers.

== Types ==
Tribometers are often referred to by the specific contact arrangement they simulate or by the original equipment developer. Several arrangements are:

- Four-ball
- Pin-on-disc
- Ball-on-disc
- Ring-on-ring
- Ball-on-three-plates
- Reciprocating-pin (usually referred to as SRV or HFRR)
- Block-on-ring
- Bouncing-ball
- Fretting test machine
- Twin-disc

=== Bouncing-ball ===
A bouncing-ball tribometer consists of a ball which is impacted at an angle against a surface. During a typical test, a ball is slid on an angle along a track until it impacts a surface and then bounces off of the surface. The friction produced in the contact between the ball and the surface results in a horizontal force on the surface and a rotational force on the ball. Frictional force is determined by finding the rotational speed of the ball using high speed photography or by measuring the force on the horizontal surface. Pressure in the contact is very high due to the large instantaneous force caused by the impact with the ball.

Bouncing-ball tribometers have been used to determine the shear characteristics of lubricants under high pressures such as is found in ball bearings or gears.

=== Pin-on-disc ===
A pin-on-disc tribometer consists of a stationary pin that is normally loaded against a rotating disc. The pin can have any shape to simulate a specific contact, but cylindrical tips are often used to simplify the contact geometry. The coefficient of friction is determined by the ratio of the frictional force to the loading force on the pin.

The pin-on-disc test has proved useful in providing a simple wear and friction test for low friction coatings such as diamond-like carbon coatings on valve train components in internal combustion engines.

== See also ==
- Abrasion
- Twist compression tester
- Tribology
