= Differential coefficient =

Derivative of a function

In physics and mathematics, the differential coefficient of a function f(x) is what is now called its derivative df(x)/dx, the (not necessarily constant) multiplicative factor or coefficient of the differential dx in the differential df(x).

A coefficient is usually a constant quantity, but the differential coefficient of f is a constant function only if f is a linear function. When f is not linear, its differential coefficient is a function, call it f′, derived by the differentiation of f, hence, the modern term, derivative.

The older usage is now rarely seen.

Early editions of Silvanus P. Thompson's Calculus Made Easy use the older term. In his 1998 update of this text, Martin Gardner lets the first use of "differential coefficient" stand, along with Thompson's criticism of the term as a needlessly obscure phrase that should not intimidate students, and substitutes "derivative" for the remainder of the book.
