= Asperity (materials science) =

Unevenness of surface, roughness, and ruggedness

The top image shows asperities under no load. The bottom image depicts the same surface after applying a load.

In materials science, asperity, defined as "unevenness of surface, roughness, ruggedness" (from the Latin asper—"rough"), has implications (for example) in physics and seismology. Typical "smooth surfaces", even those polished to a mirror finish, are still not truly smooth on a microscopic scale. They are rough, with sharp, rough, or rugged projections, termed "asperities". Surface asperities exist across multiple scales, often in a self-affine or fractal geometry. The fractal dimension of these structures has been correlated with the contact mechanics exhibited at an interface in terms of friction and contact stiffness.

An understanding of the concept of asperities is required for any understanding of the field of tribology, the scientific study of friction, wear, and lubrication.

== Surface roughness and geometry ==
Expanding on the linkage between asperities and seismology, asperities are critical in the understanding of geophysical faults via elastic deformation. These faults, such as the San Andreas fault line, tend to be extremely heterogeneous due to the abundance of asperities. In modeling, small subsections can reach laboratory failure points; however, the average stress can be summarized via a ratio of total asperity area and the total area of the fault itself, leading to net stresses caused by the asperities' low.

== Tribology and contact mechanics ==
Asperity also has usage in the process of contact modeling, which is used to predict the real area of a contact surface, as well as the surface and sub-surface stresses that increase friction and wear on an interface. This friction leads to deformation of the microscopically rough surfaces, said deformation comes in two forms, elastic and elastic-plastic. However, this deformation can be slowed via the introduction of some sort of lubricant to the surfaces.

Using the theory of rough surfaces as proposed by Greenwood and Williamson, and existing literature on elastic-hydrodynamic theory, a theoretical model can be created to explain the asperities present in high-load lubricated contacts. this model can be used to create a ratio between the theoretical lubricant film thickness and the total roughness of the surfaces. This can be used when discussing the total load of an interface.

== Friction, wear, and mechanical behaviour ==
When two macroscopically smooth surfaces come into contact, initially, they only touch at a few of these asperity points. These cover only a very small portion of the surface area. Friction and wear originate at these points, and thus understanding their behavior becomes important when studying materials in contact. When the surfaces are subjected to a compressive load, the asperities deform through plastic and then elastic modes, which can be seen in the stress-strain curve of whatever material in question, thus increasing the contact area between the two surfaces until the contact area is sufficient to support the load.

The relationship between frictional interactions and asperity geometry is complex and poorly understood. It has been reported that an increased roughness may, under certain circumstances, result in weaker frictional interactions, while smoother surfaces may in fact exhibit high levels of friction owing to high levels of true contact.

== Theoretical models ==
The Archard equation provides a simplified model of asperity deformation when materials in contact are subject to a force. Owing to the ubiquitous presence of deformable asperities in self-affine hierarchical structures the true contact area at an interface exhibits a linear relationship with the applied normal load.

== See also ==
- Surface roughness
- Burnishing (metal)
