= Physical coefficient =

Physical coefficient is an important number that characterizes some physical property of a technical or scientific object under specified conditions. A coefficient also has a scientific reference which is the reliance on force.

== Stoichiometric coefficient of a chemical compound ==
To find the coefficient of a chemical compound, you must balance the elements involved in it. For example, water: H_{2}O. It just so happens that hydrogen (H) and oxygen (O) are both diatomic molecules, thus we have H_{2} and O_{2}. To form water, one of the O atoms breaks off from the O_{2} molecule and react with the H_{2} compound to form H_{2}O. But, there is one oxygen atom left. It reacts with another H_{2} molecule. Since it took two of each atom to balance the compound, we put the coefficient 2 in front of H_{2}O: 2 H_{2}O. The total reaction is thus 2 H_{2} + O_{2} → 2 H_{2}O.

== Examples of physical coefficients ==
1. Coefficient of thermal expansion (thermodynamics) (dimensionless) - Relates the change in temperature to the change in a material's dimensions.
2. Partition coefficient (K_{D}) (chemistry) - The ratio of concentrations of a compound in two phases of a mixture of two immiscible solvents at equilibrium.
3. Hall coefficient (electrical physics) - Relates a magnetic field applied to an element to the voltage created, the amount of current and the element thickness. It is a characteristic of the material from which the conductor is made.
4. Lift coefficient (C_{L} or C_{Z}) (aerodynamics) (dimensionless) - Relates the lift generated by an airfoil with the dynamic pressure of the fluid flow around the airfoil, and the planform area of the airfoil.
5. Ballistic coefficient (BC) (aerodynamics) (units of kg/m^{2}) - A measure of a body's ability to overcome air resistance in flight. BC is a function of mass, diameter, and drag coefficient.
6. Transmission coefficient (quantum mechanics) (dimensionless) - Represents the probability flux of a transmitted wave relative to that of an incident wave. It is often used to describe the probability of a particle tunnelling through a barrier.
7. Damping factor a.k.a. viscous damping coefficient (Physical Engineering) (units of newton-seconds per meter) - relates a damping force with the velocity of the object whose motion is being dampened.
