= Wear =

Damaging, gradual removal or deformation of material at solid surfaces

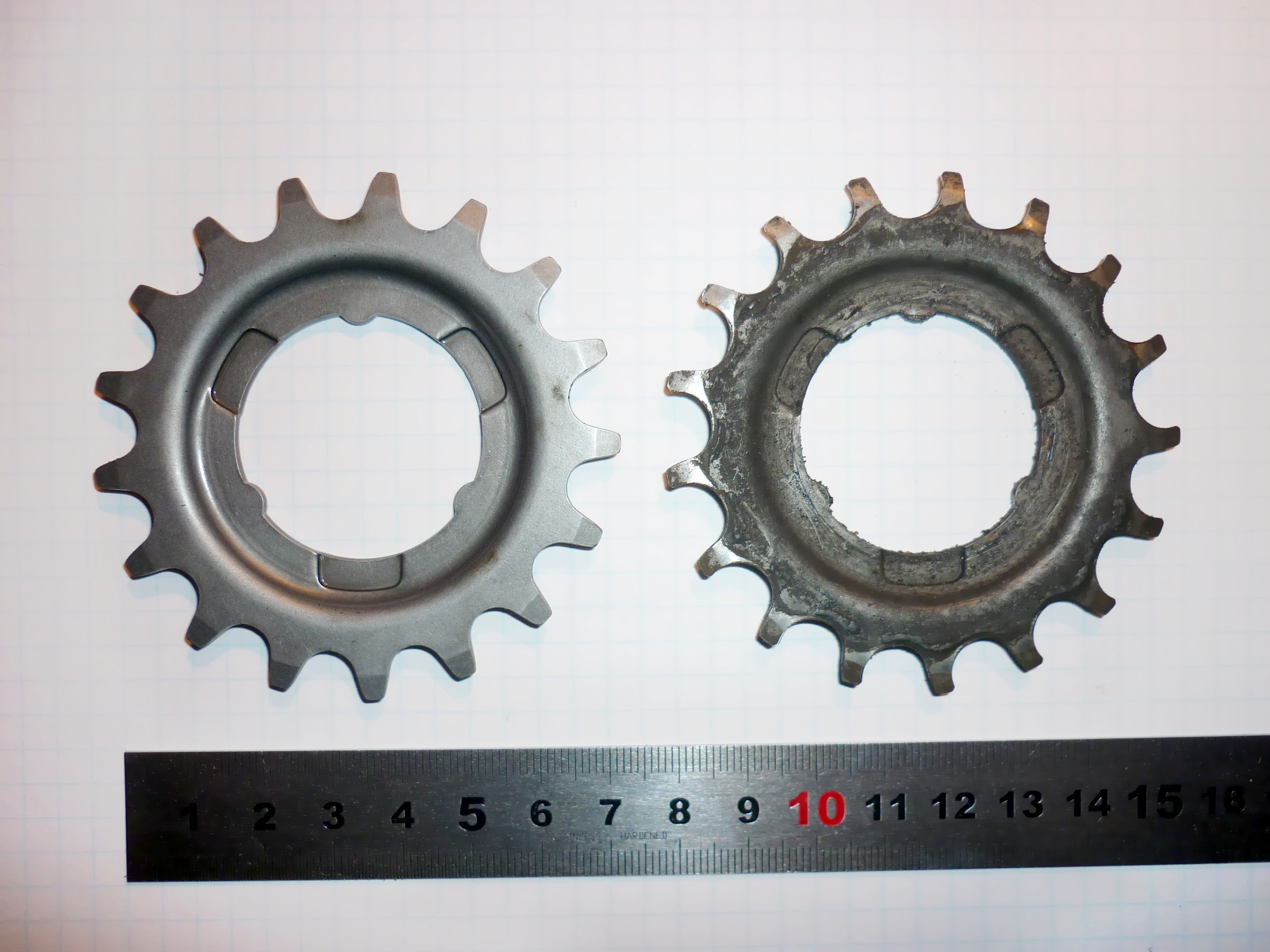
Rear (driven) bicycle sprockets. Left, new, shows no wear. Right, used, shows obvious wear from being driven clockwise.

Wear is the damaging, gradual removal or deformation of material at solid surfaces. Causes of wear can be mechanical (e.g., erosion) or chemical (e.g., corrosion). The study of wear and related processes is referred to as tribology.

Wear in machine elements, together with other processes such as fatigue and creep, causes functional surfaces to degrade, eventually leading to material failure or loss of functionality. Thus, wear has large economic relevance as first outlined in the Jost Report. Abrasive wear alone has been estimated to cost 1–4% of the gross national product of industrialized nations. Components designed to degrade, wear out or be consumed over time through normal, repetitive use are referred to as wearparts.

Wear of metals occurs by plastic displacement of surface and near-surface material and by detachment of particles that form wear debris. The particle size may vary from millimeters to nanometers. This process may occur by contact with other metals, nonmetallic solids, flowing liquids, solid particles or liquid droplets entrained in flowing gasses.

The wear rate is affected by factors such as type of loading (e.g., impact, static, dynamic), type of motion (e.g., sliding, rolling), temperature, and lubrication, in particular by the process of deposition and wearing out of the boundary lubrication layer. Depending on the tribosystem, different wear types and wear mechanisms can be observed.

== Wear types and mechanisms ==
Types of wear are identified by relative motion, the nature of disturbance at the worn surface or "mechanism", and whether it effects a self regenerative or base layer.

Wear mechanisms are the physical disturbance. For example, the mechanism of adhesive wear is adhesion. Wear mechanisms and/or sub-mechanisms frequently overlap and occur in a synergistic manner, producing a greater rate of wear than the sum of the individual wear mechanisms.

=== Adhesive wear ===
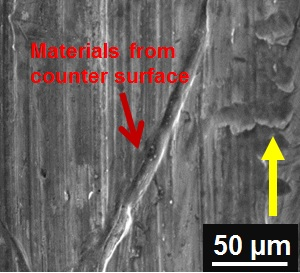
SEM micrograph of adhesive wear (transferred materials) on 52100 steel sample sliding against Al alloy. (Yellow arrow indicate sliding direction)

Adhesive wear can be found between surfaces during frictional contact and generally refers to unwanted displacement and attachment of wear debris and material compounds from one surface to another. Two adhesive wear types can be distinguished:

1. Adhesive wear is caused by relative motion, "direct contact" and plastic deformation which create wear debris and material transfer from one surface to another.
2. Cohesive adhesive forces, holds two surfaces together even though they are separated by a measurable distance, with or without any actual transfer of material.

Generally, adhesive wear occurs when two bodies slide over or are pressed into each other, which promote material transfer. This can be described as plastic deformation of very small fragments within the surface layers. The asperities or microscopic high points (surface roughness) found on each surface affect the severity of how fragments of oxides are pulled off and added to the other surface, partly due to strong adhesive forces between atoms, but also due to accumulation of energy in the plastic zone between the asperities during relative motion.

The type of mechanism and the amplitude of surface attraction varies between different materials but are amplified by an increase in the density of "surface energy". Most solids will adhere on contact to some extent. However, oxidation films, lubricants and contaminants naturally occurring generally suppress adhesion, and spontaneous exothermic chemical reactions between surfaces generally produce a substance with low energy status in the absorbed species.

Adhesive wear can lead to an increase in roughness and the creation of protrusions (i.e., lumps) above the original surface. In industrial manufacturing, this is referred to as galling, which eventually breaches the oxidized surface layer and connects to the underlying bulk material, enhancing the possibility for a stronger adhesion and plastic flow around the lump.

A simple model for the wear volume for adhesive wear, $V$, can be described by:

$V = K\frac{WL}{H_v}$

where $W$ is the load, $K$ is the wear coefficient, $L$ is the sliding distance, and $H_v$ is the hardness.

=== Abrasive wear ===
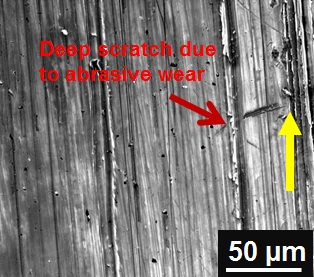
Deep 'groove' like surface indicates abrasive wear over cast iron (yellow arrow indicate sliding direction)

Abrasive wear occurs when a hard rough surface slides across a softer surface. ASTM International defines it as the loss of material due to hard particles or hard protuberances that are forced against and move along a solid surface.

Abrasive wear is commonly classified according to the type of contact and the contact environment. The type of contact determines the mode of abrasive wear. The two modes of abrasive wear are known as two-body and three-body abrasive wear. Two-body wear occurs when the grits or hard particles remove material from the opposite surface. The common analogy is that of material being removed or displaced by a cutting or plowing operation. Three-body wear occurs when the particles are not constrained, and are free to roll and slide down a surface. The contact environment determines whether the wear is classified as open or closed. An open contact environment occurs when the surfaces are sufficiently displaced to be independent of one another

There are a number of factors which influence abrasive wear and hence the manner of material removal. Several different mechanisms have been proposed to describe the manner in which the material is removed. Three commonly identified mechanisms of abrasive wear are:

1. Plowing
2. Cutting
3. Fragmentation

Plowing occurs when material is displaced to the side, away from the wear particles, resulting in the formation of grooves that do not involve direct material removal. The displaced material forms ridges adjacent to grooves, which may be removed by subsequent passage of abrasive particles.

Cutting occurs when material is separated from the surface in the form of primary debris, or microchips, with little or no material displaced to the sides of the grooves. This mechanism closely resembles conventional machining.

Fragmentation occurs when material is separated from a surface by a cutting process and the indenting abrasive causes localized fracture of the wear material. These cracks then freely propagate locally around the wear groove, resulting in additional material removal by spalling.

Abrasive wear can be measured as loss of mass by the Taber Abrasion Test according to ISO 9352 or ASTM D 4060.

The wear volume for single-abrasive wear, $V$, can be described by:

$V = \alpha\beta\frac{WL}{H_v} = K\frac{WL}{H_v}$

where $W$ is the load, $\alpha$ is the shape factor of an asperity (typically ~ 0.1), $\beta$ is the degrees of wear by an asperity (typically 0.1 to 1.0), $K$ is the wear coefficient, $L$ is the sliding distance, and $H_v$ is the hardness.

=== Surface fatigue ===
Surface fatigue is a process in which the surface of a material is weakened by cyclic loading, which is one type of general material fatigue. Fatigue wear is produced when the wear particles are detached by cyclic crack growth of microcracks on the surface. These microcracks are either superficial cracks or subsurface cracks.

=== Fretting wear ===
Fretting wear is the repeated cyclical rubbing between two surfaces. Over a period of time fretting which will remove material from one or both surfaces in contact. It occurs typically in bearings, although most bearings have their surfaces hardened to resist the problem. Another problem occurs when cracks in either surface are created, known as fretting fatigue. It is the more serious of the two phenomena because it can lead to catastrophic failure of the bearing. An associated problem occurs when the small particles removed by wear are oxidized in air. The oxides are usually harder than the underlying metal, so wear accelerates as the harder particles abrade the metal surfaces further. Fretting corrosion acts in the same way, especially when water is present. Unprotected bearings on large structures like bridges can suffer serious degradation in behaviour, especially when salt is used during the winter to deice the highways carried by the bridges. The problem of fretting corrosion was involved in the Silver Bridge tragedy and the Mianus River Bridge accident.

=== Erosive wear ===
Erosive wear can be defined as an extremely short sliding motion and is executed within a short time interval. Erosive wear is caused by the impact of particles of solid or liquid against the surface of an object. The impacting particles gradually remove material from the surface through repeated deformations and cutting actions. It is a widely encountered mechanism in industry. Due to the nature of the conveying process, piping systems are prone to wear when abrasive particles have to be transported.

The rate of erosive wear is dependent upon a number of factors. The material characteristics of the particles, such as their shape, hardness, impact velocity and impingement angle are primary factors along with the properties of the surface being eroded. The impingement angle is one of the most important factors and is widely recognized in literature. For ductile materials, the maximum wear rate is found when the impingement angle is approximately 30°, whilst for non-ductile materials the maximum wear rate occurs when the impingement angle is normal to the surface. A detailed theoretical analysis of dependency of the erosive wear on the inclination angle and material properties is provided in.

For a given particle morphology, the erosion rate, $E$, can be fit with a power law dependence on velocity:

$E = kv^n$

where $k$ is a constant, $v$ is velocity, and $n$ is a velocity exponent. $n$ is typically between 2 - 2.5 for metals and 2.5 - 3 for ceramics.

=== Corrosion and oxidation wear ===
Corrosion and oxidation wear occurs both in lubricated and dry contacts. The fundamental cause are chemical reactions between the worn material and the corroding medium. Wear caused by a synergistic action of tribological stresses and corrosion is also called tribocorrosion.

=== Sliding wear ===
Under sliding friction conditions, the wear behaviour of metallic materials is strongly influenced by surface strain hardening, formation of tribolayers, oxidation processes and the morphology of wear debris particles. Austenitic manganese steels and graphitized cast irons may exhibit different wear mechanisms depending on contact conditions, graphite distribution and the stability of mechanically mixed surface layers.

=== Impact wear ===
Impact wear is caused by contact between two bodies. Unlike erosive wear, impact wear always occurs at the same, well-defined place. If the impact is repeated, then usually with constant kinetic energy at the moment of impact. The frequency of impacts can vary. Wear can occur on both bodies, but usually, one body has significantly higher hardness and toughness and its wear is neglected.

=== Other types of wear ===
Other, less common types of wear are cavitation and diffusive wear.

== Wear stages ==
Under nominal operation conditions, the wear rate normally changes in three different stages:

- Primary stage or early run-in period, where surfaces adapt to each other and the wear-rate might vary between high and low.
- Secondary stage or mid-age process, where steady wear can be observed. Most of the component's operational life is spent in this stage.
- Tertiary stage or old-age period, where surfaces are subjected to rapid failure due to a high rate of wear.

The wear rate is strongly influenced by the operating conditions and the formation of tribofilms. The secondary stage is shortened with increasing severity of environmental conditions, such as high temperatures, strain rates and stresses.

So-called wear maps, demonstrating wear rate under different operation condition, are used to determine stable operation points for tribological contacts. Wear maps also show dominating wear modes under different loading conditions.

In explicit wear tests simulating industrial conditions between metallic surfaces, there are no clear chronological distinction between different wear-stages due to big overlaps and symbiotic relations between various friction mechanisms. Surface engineering and treatments are used to minimize wear and extend the components working life.

== Wear testing ==
Several standard test methods exist for different types of wear to determine the amount of material removal during a specified time period under well-defined conditions. ASTM International Committee G-2 standardizes wear testing for specific applications, which are periodically updated. The Society for Tribology and Lubrication Engineers (STLE) has documented a large number of frictional, wear and lubrication tests. Standardized wear tests are used to create comparative material rankings for a specific set of test parameter as stipulated in the test description. To obtain more accurate predictions of wear in industrial applications it is necessary to conduct wear testing under conditions simulating the exact wear process.

An attrition test is a test that is carried out to measure the resistance of a granular material to wear.

== Modeling of wear ==
The Reye–Archard–Khrushchov wear law is the classic wear prediction model.

== Measuring wear ==
=== Wear coefficient ===
The wear coefficient is a physical coefficient used to measure, characterize and correlate the wear of materials.

=== Lubricant analysis ===
Lubricant analysis is an alternative, indirect way of measuring wear. Here, wear is detected by the presence of wear particles in a liquid lubricant. To gain further insights into the nature of the particles, chemical (such as XRF, ICP-OES), structural (such as ferrography) or optical analysis (such as light microscopy) can be performed.

=== Digital analysis of wear debris ===
Recent developments in wear diagnostics have increasingly involved digital image analysis and computer-integrated surface characterization techniques for studying the morphology, size distribution and evolution of wear particles formed during frictional contact. Such approaches complement classical methods of wear assessment by enabling automated identification of damage mechanisms and subsurface degradation processes. Advanced applications include the use of computer vision and data-driven algorithms for analysing wear products in metallic tribosystems, including hydrogen-affected steels subjected to long-term loading conditions.

Automated wear particle recognition has also been explored using artificial intelligence and big-data techniques to improve predictive maintenance and condition monitoring of engineering systems.

More broadly, systematic analysis of wear debris morphology has long been recognised as an important tool for understanding wear mechanisms and transitions between mild and severe wear regimes.

Modern tribological research therefore increasingly combines traditional experimental techniques with digital surface metrology and machine-learning-assisted interpretation of wear processes.

== See also ==
- Abrasion (mechanical), process of wearing down a surface
- Archard equation, model used to describe wear
- Backlash (engineering), clearance between mating components
- Concrete degradation, damage to concrete affecting its mechanical strength and its durability
- Hysteresis, dependence of the state of a system on its history
- Reye's hypothesis, model used to describe wear
- Sacrificial part, machine component engineered to fail first and protect the rest of the device
- Tribometer, instrument that measures friction and wear between surfaces — Equipment used to measure friction and wear
- Wear coefficient, used to measure, characterize and correlate the wear of materials
