= Forensic metrology =

Science of measurement applied to forensics

Forensic metrology is a branch of metrology (the science of measurements) applied to forensic sciences. Metrology has evolved various techniques for assessing the margin of error or uncertainty associated with measurements. Forensic laboratories and criminalistic laboratories perform numerous measurements and tests to support criminal prosecution and civil legal actions. Examples of forensic metrology include the measurement of alcohol content in blood using breathalyzers, quantification of controlled substances (both net weights and purity), and length measurements of firearm barrels. The results of forensic measurements are used to determine if a person is charged with a crime or may be used to determine a statutory sentencing enhancement. Other examples of forensic metrology include tests that measure if there is a presence of a substance (e.g., cocaine), latent print examination, questioned documents examination, and DNA analysis.

Forensic measurements are all supported by reference standards which are traceable to the International System of Units (SI) maintained by the International Bureau of Weights and Measures, to natural constants, or to reference materials such as those provided by the United States' national metrology institute known as the National Institute of Standards and Technology in Gaithersburg, Maryland.

Examples of instruments and equipment used in forensic metrology include breathalyzers, weighing balances and scales, rulers, calipers, gas chromatographs, and centrifuges.

Recent attention has been given to forensic metrology and metrological traceability as a result of an international effort to accredit forensic laboratories and criminalistic laboratories to the International Organization for Standardization 17025 requirements.

== Historical development of forensic metrology ==
The historical development of forensic metrology spans centuries, evolving alongside advancements in science, technology, and forensic investigation techniques. From its early beginnings in ancient civilizations where rudimentary measurement tools were used in legal proceedings, forensic metrology gained momentum with the formalization of forensic science in the 19th century, emphasizing the importance of trace evidence. Standardization efforts in the late 19th and early 20th centuries established consistent measurement standards through organizations like the International Bureau of Weights and Measures (BIPM). The mid-20th century witnessed a revolution in instrumentation, with the development of precision instruments enabling more accurate measurements of trace evidence. Later, the digital revolution further propelled forensic metrology forward, with advancements in digital imaging and data analysis enhancing measurement accuracy and efficiency. ISO standards, particularly ISO/IEC 17025, have provided guidelines for quality management systems, driving improvements in forensic measurement practices. Increasing recognition of the interdisciplinary nature of forensic investigations has fostered collaboration between metrologists, forensic scientists, and legal experts, leading to specialized measurement techniques tailored to forensic casework challenges. Looking ahead, ongoing advancements in technology, such as miniaturization and data analytics, are poised to shape the future of forensic metrology, expanding its capabilities and improving forensic analysis resolution and specificity.

== Applications of forensic metrology ==
Forensic metrology extends its applications beyond the realms of traditional forensic science disciplines, encompassing fields such as accident reconstruction, forensic toxicology, ballistics analysis, forensic anthropology, and toolmark examination. Accident reconstruction relies heavily on precise measurements to analyze vehicle dynamics, impact forces, and trajectories to determine the sequence of events leading to an accident. In forensic toxicology, metrology plays a vital role in the accurate quantification of drugs, toxins, and other substances in biological samples, aiding in the determination of cause of death and drug-related fatalities. Ballistics analysis involves the measurement of bullet trajectories, firearm characteristics, and toolmark impressions to link firearms to crime scenes and identify potential suspects. Forensic anthropology utilizes metrological techniques such as osteometric measurements and 3D scanning to analyze skeletal remains, aiding in the identification of unknown individuals and the reconstruction of past events. Additionally, toolmark examination involves precise measurements of tool impressions left at crime scenes to match tools to specific marks, providing valuable evidence in criminal investigations. These diverse applications highlight the versatility and significance of forensic metrology in various forensic science disciplines.

== Standards and accreditation ==
Adherence to international standards, particularly ISO/IEC 17025, is paramount in ensuring the reliability and accuracy of measurements conducted in forensic laboratories. Accreditation to these standards serves as a quality assurance mechanism, guaranteeing that laboratories operate according to recognized best practices and meet stringent criteria for competency and proficiency. ISO/IEC 17025 establishes requirements for the competence of testing and calibration laboratories, encompassing factors such as personnel qualifications, equipment calibration, quality control procedures, and documentation practices. By adhering to these standards, forensic laboratories demonstrate their commitment to quality and reliability, instilling confidence in the accuracy and integrity of the measurements they produce. Accreditation to ISO/IEC 17025 not only enhances the credibility of forensic metrology practices but also facilitates international recognition and acceptance of forensic evidence in legal proceedings. Moreover, adherence to these standards promotes consistency and comparability of measurements across laboratories, facilitating collaboration and data sharing within the forensic science community. Accreditation to international standards such as ISO/IEC 17025 plays a crucial role in ensuring the trustworthiness and effectiveness of forensic metrology practices, ultimately contributing to the pursuit of justice and truth in legal proceedings.

== Quality assurance measures ==
Quality assurance measures are essential in forensic metrology laboratories to uphold the integrity of measurements and mitigate the risk of errors or inaccuracies. Instrument calibration is a fundamental aspect of quality assurance, ensuring that measurement devices are accurate and reliable by comparing their readings to known reference standards. Proficiency testing is another crucial component, laboratories participate in external proficiency testing programs to assess their measurement capabilities and identify areas for improvement. Additionally, validation of measurement methods is conducted to verify the accuracy, precision, and reliability of analytical procedures, ensuring that they meet specified performance criteria and are suitable for their intended forensic applications. These quality assurance measures collectively contribute to the robustness and reliability of forensic metrology practices, instilling confidence in the accuracy and validity of measurement results.

== Challenges and emerging trends ==
Forensic metrologists encounter various challenges, including the demand for enhanced methods to analyze complex samples and novel types of evidence. Analyzing complex samples, such as mixtures containing multiple substances or degraded materials, presents difficulties in accurately identifying and quantifying individual components. Moreover, the emergence of novel types of evidence, such as digital and multimedia data, requires innovative approaches to measurement and analysis to ensure their admissibility and reliability in forensic investigations. In response to these challenges, emerging trends in forensic metrology involve the integration of advanced technologies, particularly machine learning and artificial intelligence, into measurement analysis. Machine learning algorithms can facilitate the interpretation of complex data sets, enabling automated pattern recognition and decision-making in forensic metrology applications. Artificial intelligence techniques, such as neural networks and deep learning, offer opportunities to improve the accuracy and efficiency of forensic measurements, particularly in fields like image analysis and pattern matching. By harnessing these advanced technologies, forensic metrologists can overcome challenges and enhance the effectiveness of measurement analysis in forensic science.

== Interdisciplinary approaches ==
The interdisciplinary nature of forensic metrology highlights the importance of collaboration between metrologists, forensic scientists, law enforcement agencies, and other stakeholders in the criminal justice system. By bringing together expertise from diverse fields, such as metrology, chemistry, biology, and criminalistics, interdisciplinary approaches enhance the reliability and validity of forensic measurements. Metrologists provide expertise in measurement science, ensuring that forensic measurements adhere to established standards and principles of accuracy and precision. Forensic scientists contribute specialized knowledge in the analysis of forensic evidence, interpreting measurement data to extract meaningful forensic information. Law enforcement agencies play a crucial role in collecting and preserving evidence, providing context and relevance to forensic measurements within the criminal investigation process. Collaboration among these stakeholders facilitates the integration of complementary skills and perspectives, fostering comprehensive and robust forensic analyses that withstand scrutiny in legal proceedings. Interdisciplinary collaboration promotes innovation and advances in forensic metrology, driving improvements in measurement techniques, instrumentation, and data analysis methodologies. By working together, meteorologists, forensic scientists, and other stakeholders contribute to the advancement of forensic science and the pursuit of justice.

== Ethical considerations ==
Ethical considerations are predominant in forensic metrology, emphasizing the importance of impartiality, objectivity, transparency, and respect for individual rights throughout the measurement process. Impartiality and objectivity ensure that forensic metrologists conduct measurements without bias or undue influence, adhering strictly to scientific principles and methodologies. Transparency in reporting results is essential for maintaining the integrity of forensic measurements, allowing stakeholders to understand the methods employed and assess the reliability of the findings. Moreover, safeguarding the privacy and rights of individuals involved in forensic investigations is critical, ensuring that measurement data are collected and used ethically and responsibly. By upholding these ethical principles, forensic metrologists uphold the trust and integrity of the forensic science community, promoting fairness, accuracy, and accountability in the pursuit of justice.

== See also ==
- Dimensional metrology
- Historical metrology
- Smart Metrology
- Time metrology
- Quantum metrology
