= Jan Gyllenbok =

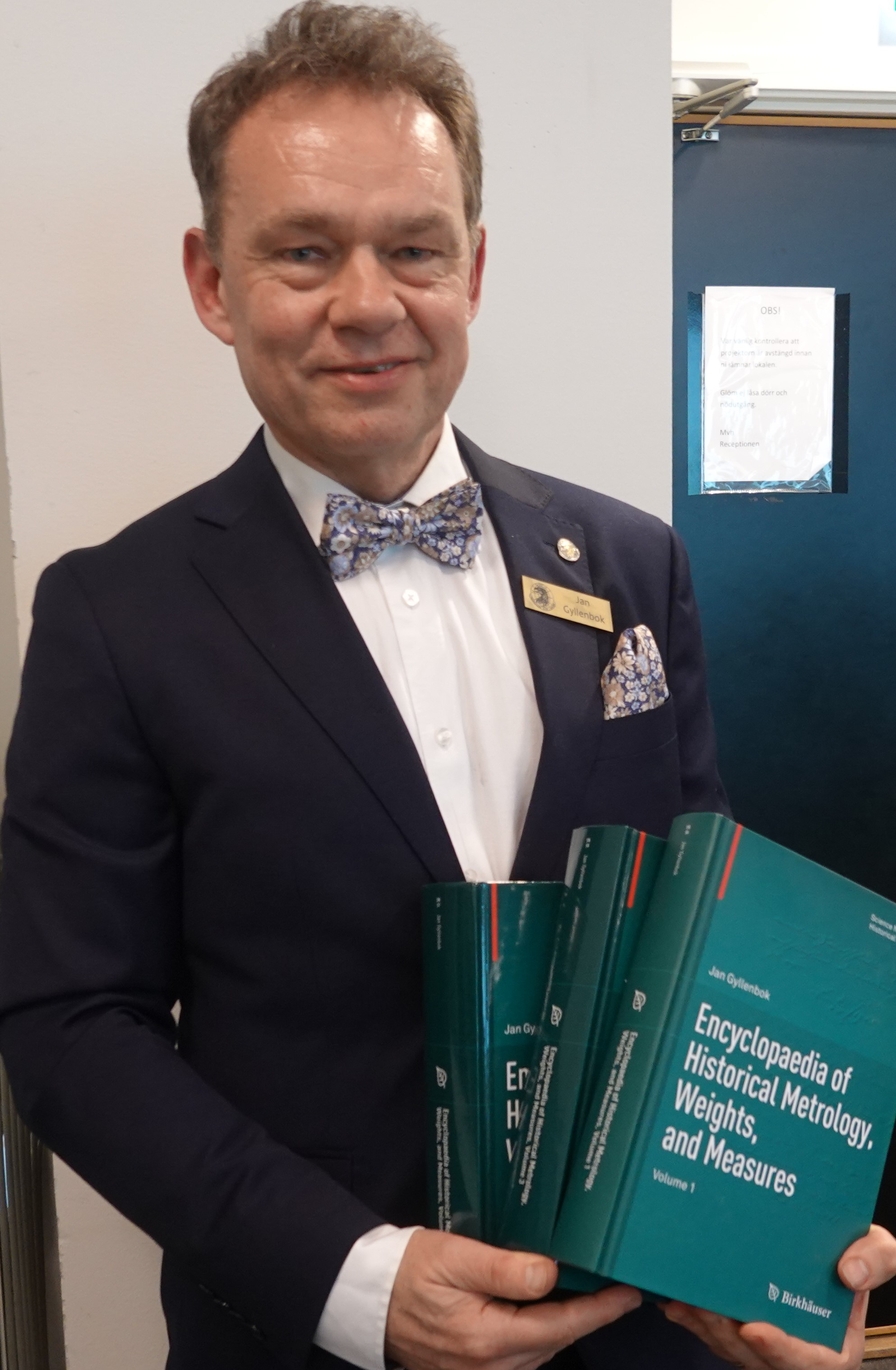
- Jan Gyllenbok in 2022 (Photo: Bill Hansen)
- Born: November 12, 1963 (age 62); Lund, Sweden
- Occupation: Metrologist

Jan Gyllenbok (born 12 November 1963) is a Swedish author and expert on historical metrology with an academic background in engineering and computer science. He is known for his encyclopedia on historical systems of measurement units.

== Published works ==
- Encyclopaedia of Historical Metrology, Weights, and Measures Volume 1, hardcover: 678 pages, Birkhäuser Basel, Series: Science Networks. Historical Studies, Vol. 56 (2018), ISBN 978-3-319-57596-4
- Encyclopaedia of Historical Metrology, Weights, and Measures Volume 2, hardcover: 969 pages, Birkhäuser Basel, Series: Science Networks. Historical Studies, Vol. 57 (2018) ISBN 978-3-319-66690-7
- Encyclopaedia of Historical Metrology, Weights, and Measures Volume 3, hardcover: 918 pages, Birkhäuser Basel, Series: Science Networks. Historical Studies, Vol. 58 (2018) ISBN 978-3-319-66711-9

== See also ==
- Historical metrology
