= Realisation (metrology) =

Conversion of the definition of a unit of measure into reality

In metrology, the realisation of a unit of measure is the conversion of its definition into reality.

An example of the concept of realisation, take the unit of length, the metre. The metre was originally defined in 1791 as one ten-millionth of the distance from the equator to the North Pole along a great circle. To actually measure a length, this definition must be converted into a physical tool, which can be used to complete the measurement. The metre stick is the realisation of the metre.

The International Bureau of Weights and Measures maintains the techniques for realisation of the base units in the International System of Units (SI), all seven of which are defined in terms of natural physical constants, rather than human artefacts such as the standard kilogram. Following the 2019 revision of the SI all fundamental units of metrology are now defined in terms of natural physical constants, rather than human artefacts. The realisation of these units is also defined by a published "Practice for the Realization of the Unit", for each unit. This is a detailed set of technical instructions for the construction of a device that will produce a practical realisation of each unit. Any competent person, who follows these instructions can realize any unit.

For example, the metre is defined as 1/299792458 of the distance light travels in one second. The Practice for the Realization of the Metre describes how to build an apparatus to determine this distance. Using this apparatus it is possible to construct a metre stick which is the realisation of the metre.

The International vocabulary of metrology identifies three distinct methods of realisation:

1. Realisation of a measurement unit from its definition.
2. Reproduction of measurement standards.
3. Adopting a particular artefact as a standard.

== Overview ==
The Oxford English Dictionary defines the word "realise" (also spelt "realize") as "to convert (something imagined, planned, etc.) into real existence or fact". The International vocabulary of metrology identifies three distinct ways in which this is done – the first being the realisation of a measurement unit from its definition, the second the reproduction of measurement standards and the third the process of actually adopting a particular artefact as a standard.

== Techniques ==
=== Time ===
The realisation of time has gone through three phases. During both the first and second phases, man used solar time – during the first phase, realisation of time was by observing the Earth's rotation using such devices as the sundial or astrolabe. During the second phase actual timing devices such as hourglasses or clocks were used. If the user needed to know time-of-day rather than elapsed time, clocks were synchronised with astronomical time. The third phase made use of clocks that were sufficiently accurate that they could measure variations in the Earth's rotation – such clocks taking over from the rotation of the earth as the prime measure of time.

==== Direct measurement of solar time ====
- Sundials and astrolabes

==== Timekeepers ====
- Accuracy of clocks

==== Time generators ====
- Radiation frequency and SI

=== Length ===
Units of length, along with mass (or weight) and time, are one of the earliest quantities that was measured by man. Historically two distinct approaches were used – one was to use a naturally occurring phenomenon such as a particular seed or part of the human body, the other was to use a standard length that was held by a community leader.

- Natural units – barleycorn, feet
- Regal units – measures held by ruler
- Using speed of light

An example of a modern realisation is the realisation of the metre in terms of optical frequency standards.

=== Volume ===
- Jugs etc. in ancient times
- Not a base unit in SI

=== Mass ===
- Grains
- Artefacts held by governments (e.g. the International Prototype of the Kilogram)
- Kibble balance and Avogadro experiment

=== Electric charge ===
- Silver nitrate deposits
- force between conductors
- charge on the electron

=== Temperature ===
- freezing & boiling water
- Non-linearity etc.
- Boltzmann constant

=== Photometry ===
- Sensitivity of the eye

=== Amount of substance ===
- Development of the mole
