= Plane wave tube =

Test facility used in acoustics

An acoustic duct or plane wave tube is a test facility used in acoustics. Anechoic chambers are typically subject to a low frequency limit, governed by the length of the sound absorbing wedges employed to prevent reflections within the chamber. Test and measurement microphone calibration services are often required to be undertaken at frequencies where anechoic chambers cannot be used effectively. In this case, a plane wave acoustic duct with anechoic termination provides a practical alternative.

Such a facility consists of a long duct, with speakers (or other oscillating piston), sirens, or modulated airflow generating sound at one end and very large acoustically absorbent wedges at the other end to terminate the tube at its characteristic acoustic impedance. The duct cross section dimensions are made sufficiently small compared to the wavelength at the frequencies of interest that sound can be assumed to propagate down the duct as a plane wave with no reflections from the sides. Acoustic ducts are most commonly used by national measurement institutes that specialise in acoustical measurement (such as the National Physical Laboratory (United Kingdom)), who use them for measurement microphone calibration at low frequencies.
