= Smart Metrology =

Approach to industrial metrology

Smart Metrology is a modern approach to industrial metrology. The name was introduced by Jean-Michel Pou and Laurent Leblond, a French meteorologist and a French statistician. The term was coined in their book, La Smart Metrology: De la métrologie des instruments à la métrologie des décisions. It was then adopted by Deltamu, a French company providing services in the field of industrial metrology.

The approach promoted by Smart Metrology applies the exploitation of data and information, including that provided by big data, to implement an approach based on the three pillars of metrology (uncertainty, calibration and traceability) in industrial applications.

== Approach ==
The approach suggested by Smart Metrology is fully framed within the ISO 9001 recommendations. Usual metrology is often regarded as a pure cost and is actually not following the ISO 9001 quality standards.

=== Innovation ===
Smart Metrology follows a different approach according to the following steps:

- The measuring equipment is monitored using historical and relevant data to detect whether a doubt exists. If such a doubt exists, the equipment is calibrated.
- The available (a priori) information is used by applying advanced statistical approaches, such as Bayesian inference, for monitoring and is used in the decision-making process.
- The calibration intervals were not at fixed intervals.

== Smart Metrology and big data ==
Smart Metrology plays a key role in ensuring the reliability of data in the context of Big Data. This technological paradigm is defined by the ability to collect and store vast volumes of data from diverse sources, and to process them using advanced computing techniques, including Artificial Intelligence (AI).

In such data-driven environments, the veracity of the data becomes a fundamental requirement. The primary mission of Smart Metrology is to ensure the reliability of measured values, thus enabling accurate and meaningful decision-making. Unlike traditional approaches that focus mainly on compliance with standards, Smart Metrology incorporates risk management and measurement uncertainty as central components of the decision-making process.

Additionally, Smart Metrology promotes the use of a priori knowledge—previous understanding of the system or entity being measured—to improve the interpretation of measurement results. This approach helps reduce uncertainty and enhances the accuracy of predictions and industrial control systems.

== See also ==
- Dimensional metrology
- Forensic metrology
- Quantum metrology
- Time metrology
