= EURAMET =

EURAMET (European Association of National Metrology Institutes, previously known as EUROMET, the European Collaboration in Measurement Standards) is a collaborative alliance of national metrological organizations from member states of the European Union (EU) and of the European Free Trade Association (EFTA) whose purpose is to achieve higher efficiency by co-ordinating and sharing metrological activities and services.

EURAMET was established on 11 January 2007 in Berlin. Legally it is a company registered under German law with its offices in Braunschweig and on 1 July 2007 took over the role of EUROMET as a Regional Metrology Organisation. EUROMET was created in Madrid, Spain, on 23 September 1987 and became operative on 1 January 1988.

Full membership of EURAMET is restricted to national metrology institutes (NMIs) of EU and EFTA member states, well-established NMIs of other European states, and the European Commission's Institute working in the field of Metrology. Associate membership is available for designated metrology institutes from member states and NMIs which, for various reasons, cannot be full members.

To further strengthen Europe's ability to respond to emerging metrology needs and to concentrate existing know how, EURAMET established European Metrology Networks (EMN). EMNs were created as dedicated structures for specific priority topics. Each network focuses on an area of strategic importance such as energy, climate, quantum technologies or advanced manufacturing. They bring together national laboratories, universities and industrial partners to create a shared platform for research, testing and application.

EURAMET coordinates metrological activity at a European level, liaising with the International Organization of Legal Metrology and the International Bureau of Weights and Measures where appropriate. Amongst its publications are various calibration and technical guides and a booklet on European time zones.

== See also ==
- WELMEC, a body that promotes European cooperation in the field of legal metrology
