= Joint Committee for Guides in Metrology =

Standards organisation in France

The Joint Committee for Guides in Metrology (JCGM) is an organization in Sèvres that prepared the Guide to the Expression of Uncertainty in Measurement (GUM) and the International Vocabulary of Metrology (VIM). The JCGM assumed responsibility for these two documents from the ISO Technical Advisory Group 4 (TAG4).

== Partner organizations ==
Partner organizations below send representatives into the JCGM:

- International Bureau of Weights and Measures (BIPM)
- International Electrotechnical Commission (IEC)
- International Federation of Clinical Chemistry and Laboratory Medicine (IFCC)
- International Organization for Standardization (ISO)
- International Union of Pure and Applied Chemistry (IUPAC)
- International Union of Pure and Applied Physics (IUPAP)
- International Organization of Legal Metrology (OIML)
- International Laboratory Accreditation Cooperation (ILAC)

== Working groups ==
JCGM has two Working Groups. Working Group 1, "Expression of uncertainty in measurement", has the task to promote the use of the GUM and to prepare Supplements and other documents for its broad application. Working Group 2, "Working Group on International vocabulary of basic and general terms in metrology (VIM)", has the task to revise and promote the use of the VIM. For further information on the activity of the JCGM, see www.bipm.org.

== Publications ==
=== GUM: Guide to the Expression of Uncertainty in Measurement ===
The Guide to the Expression of Uncertainty in Measurement (GUM) is a document published by the JCGM that establishes general rules for evaluating and expressing uncertainty in measurement.

The GUM provides a way to express the perceived quality of the result of a measurement. Rather than express the result by providing an estimate of the measurand along with information about systematic and random error values (in the form of an "error analysis"), the GUM approach is to express the result of a measurement as an estimate of the measurand along with an associated measurement uncertainty.

One of the basic premises of the GUM approach is that it is possible to characterize the quality of a measurement by accounting for both systematic and random errors on a comparable footing, and a method is provided for doing that. This method refines the information previously provided in an "error analysis", and puts it on a probabilistic basis through the concept of measurement uncertainty.

Another basic premise of the GUM approach is that it is not possible to state how well the true value of the measurand is known, but only how well it is believed to be known. Measurement uncertainty can therefore be described as a measure of how well one believes one knows the true value of the measurand. This uncertainty reflects the incomplete knowledge of the measurand.

The notion of "belief" is an important one, since it moves metrology into a realm where results of measurement need to be considered and quantified in terms of probabilities that express degrees of belief.

For a review on other applicable measurement uncertainty guidance documents see.

=== VIM: International Vocabulary of Metrology ===
The International Vocabulary of Metrology (VIM) is an attempt to find a common language and terminology in metrology, i.e. the science of measurements, across different fields of science, legislation and commerce. The third edition was developed using the principles of terminology work (ISO 704:2000 Terminology Work – Principles and Methods; ISO 1087-1:2000 Terminology Work – Vocabulary – Part 1:Theory and Application; ISO 10241:1992 International Terminology Standards – Preparation and Layout).

The VIM is the most global attempt to standardize terminology across different fields of science, legislation, commerce and trade.

==== Usage ====
Acceptance of VIM standards is rather good in legislation, commerce and trade where it is often legally required. Acceptance is also good in textbooks and many fields of sciences. There are, however, some fields of science that stick to their traditional jargon, most notably theoretical physics and mass spectrometry.

=== Revisions ===
Revision by Working Group 1 of the GUM itself is under way, in parallel with work on preparing documents in a series of JCGM documents under the generic heading Evaluation of measurement data. The parts in the series are:

- JCGM 100:2008. Evaluation of measurement data – Guide to the expression of uncertainty in measurement (GUM).
- JCGM 101:2008. Evaluation of measurement data – Supplement 1 to the "Guide to the expression of uncertainty in measurement" – Propagation of distributions using a Monte Carlo method.
- JCGM 102:2011. Evaluation of measurement data – Supplement 2 to the "Guide to the expression of uncertainty in measurement" – Extension to any number of output quantities.
- JCGM 103. Evaluation of measurement data – Supplement 3 to the "Guide to the expression of uncertainty in measurement" – Developing and using measurement models. (Under development)
- JCGM 104:2009. Evaluation of measurement data – An introduction to the "Guide to the expression of uncertainty in measurement" and related documents.
- JCGM 105. Evaluation of measurement data – Concepts, principles and methods for the expression of measurement uncertainty. (Under development)
- JCGM 106:2012. Evaluation of measurement data – The role of measurement uncertainty in conformity assessment.
- JCGM 107. Evaluation of measurement data – Applications of the least-squares method. (planned)
- JCGM 108. Evaluation of measurement data – Supplement 4 to the "Guide to the expression of uncertainty in measurement" – Bayesian methods. (planned)

== See also ==
- International System of Quantities
- International System of Units (SI)
- SI base unit
- SI derived unit
- Order of magnitude
- Long and short scales
- Dimensional analysis
- History of measurement
- Measurement uncertainty
