= WELMEC =

European legal metrology body

WELMEC is a body set up to promote European cooperation in the field of legal metrology. WELMEC members are drawn from the national authorities responsible for legal metrology in European Union (EU) and European Free Trade Association (EFTA) member states.

WELMEC state their mission as being "to develop and maintain mutual acceptance among its members and to maintain effective cooperation to achieve a harmonised and consistent approach to the societies needs for legal metrology and for the benefit of all stakeholders including consumers and businesses."

WELMEC was established in 1990, at a meeting in Bern, Switzerland, and was originally the acronym for the "Western European Legal Metrology Cooperation". As of February 2013 WELMEC has 30 members and 7 associate members. Today, although the name is still WELMEC, as the European Union extended its membership outside Western Europe, so did WELMEC, the organisation's membership encompassing EU member states, EFTA members and aspiring EU members: one of the aims of WELMEC being the provision of assistance to aspiring EU members in aligning their legal metrology process with those of the EU.

As of 2013, WELMEC's principal activities centered on the operation of the EU Nonautomatic Weighing Instruments Directive (NAWI – EU directive 2009/23/EC) and the implementation of the EU Measuring Instruments Directive (MID – EU directive (2004/22/EC). The organisation's working parties, which map onto various aspects of these two directives, are:

- WG 2 Directive Implementation (2009/23/EC)
- WG 5 Metrological supervision
- WG 6 Prepackages
- WG 7 Software
- WG 8 Measuring Instruments Directive
- WG 10 Measuring equipment for liquids other than water
- WG 11 Gas and Electricity Meters
- WG 13 Water and Thermal Energy Meters

== See also ==
- EURAMET, the European Association of National Metrology Institutes
- International Organization of Legal Metrology
