= Historical metrology =

Study of measurement systems

Historical metrology is the science and study of the different units of measurement and measurement systems (including monetary units) which have been used by various countries and places throughout history.

== Published reports ==
For some countries, principal divisions of executive governments have published reports that compile formerly used weights and measures. For example, this has been done for Bolivia, Great Britain, Costa Rica, Mexico, Portugal, Spain, Tanzania and the United States. In 1954, 1955, and 1966, the United Nations compiled reports aimed at giving an overview of the non-metric units then in use in different parts of the world. In 2018, the first of three volumes of the book "Encyclopaedia of Historical Metrology, Weights, and Measures" was published. The book addresses the myriad units of measurement that have arisen through the ages, from weights used by ancient cultures to the scientific units of the modern world.

== See also ==
- Dimensional metrology
- Forensic metrology
- Smart Metrology
- Time metrology
- Quantum metrology
