= Astronomical time =

Astronomical time is a time based on cyclic astronomical events. Simple examples are the recurring cycle of day and night, a consequence of Earth's rotation, and the recurring cycle of the year as the Earth circles the Sun. Requirements for high precision time scales in astronomy have led to continue refinements in the definition of time.

Some of the time standard scales are sidereal time, solar time, and universal time.

== Rotational time ==
To use Earth's rotation as a basis for timekeeping requires precise measurement of the rotation rate. Observations of star motion as the Earth rotates gives Sidereal time. This form of time is vital for astronomy but inconvenient for normal uses because it ignores the position of the Sun. Thus the Sun could be overhead at sidereal midnight.

Solar time, measuring Earth's rotation with respect to the Sun, was the historical basis for civil time. Precise measurements must account for the elliptical orbit of the Earth around the Sun. Mean solar time accounts for this effect.

Basing time on the Earth's rotation assumes that the rotation speed is constant. However astronomical observations have shown three variations in speed. Secular variation is a linear increase the length of a day due to tidal friction. This effect increases the length of the day by 0.0005 to 0.0035 seconds per century. Irregular variation on the scale of a decade seem to be related to geological processes inside the Earth. They can be as large as 0.001 seconds over two hundred years. Periodic variations on the scale of days result from Earth tides both from the Moon and Sun as well as effects of global weather. These can create shifts on the order of 0.00005 seconds per day. The combination of these effects means the Earth's rotation rate is unpredictable at very high precision

=== Ephemeris time ===
Rather than the irregular rotation of the Earth, time can be based on solar system motions. This form is known as ephemeris time.

=== Atomic time ===
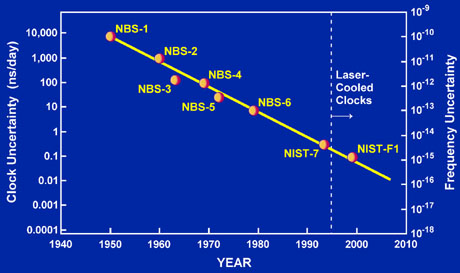
Historical accuracy of atomic clocks from NIST.

From the Systeme Internationale (SI) comes the second as defined by the duration of 9 192 631 770 cycles of a particular hyperfine structure transition in the ground state of caesium-133 (^{133}Cs). For practical usability a device is required that attempts to produce the SI second (s) such as an atomic clock. But not all such clocks agree. The weighted mean of many clocks distributed over the whole Earth defines the Temps Atomique International; i.e., the Atomic Time TAI. From the General theory of relativity the time measured depends on the altitude on earth and the spatial velocity of the clock so that TAI refers to a location on sea level that rotates with the Earth.

== History ==
In 1925, Universal time defined as mean solar time beginning at midnight; by 1956 this system cam into general use. A set of corrections for effects of Earth's irregular rotation speed where defined in 1986 as Coordinated Universal Time or UTC.

Since the Earth's rotation is irregular, any time scale derived from it such as Greenwich Mean Time leads to recurring problems in predicting the Ephemerides for the positions of the Moon, Sun, planets and their natural satellites. In 1950 Ephemeris time was defined as a fraction of the length of the year 1900 to create a more uniform time scale. In 1979 this time was renamed dynamical time

In 1976 the International Astronomical Union (IAU) resolved that the theoretical basis for ephemeris time (ET) was wholly non-relativistic, and therefore, beginning in 1984 ephemeris time would be replaced by two further time scales with allowance for relativistic corrections. Their names, assigned in 1979, emphasized their dynamical nature or origin, Barycentric Dynamical Time (TDB) and Terrestrial Dynamical Time (TDT). Both were defined for continuity with ET and were based on what had become the standard SI second, which in turn had been derived from the measured second of ET.

During the period 1991–2006, the TDB and TDT time scales were both redefined and replaced, owing to difficulties or inconsistencies in their original definitions. The current fundamental relativistic time scales are Geocentric Coordinate Time (TCG) and Barycentric Coordinate Time (TCB). Both of these have rates that are based on the SI second in respective reference frames (and hypothetically outside the relevant gravity well), but due to relativistic effects, their rates would appear slightly faster when observed at the Earth's surface, and therefore diverge from local Earth-based time scales using the SI second at the Earth's surface.

The currently defined IAU time scales also include Terrestrial Time (TT) (replacing TDT, and now defined as a re-scaling of TCG, chosen to give TT a rate that matches the SI second when observed at the Earth's surface), and a redefined Barycentric Dynamical Time (TDB), a re-scaling of TCB to give TDB a rate that matches the SI second at the Earth's surface.

=== Stellar dynamical time scale ===
For a star, the dynamical time scale is defined as the time that would be taken for a test particle released at the surface to fall under the star's potential to the centre point, if pressure forces were negligible. In other words, the dynamical time scale measures the amount of time it would take a certain star to collapse in the absence of any internal pressure. By appropriate manipulation of the equations of stellar structure this can be found to be

$\tau_{dynamical} \simeq \frac{R}{v} = \sqrt{\frac{R^3}{2GM}} \sim 1/\sqrt{G\rho}$

where R is the radius of the star, G is the gravitational constant, M is the mass of the star, ρ the star gas density (assumed constant here) and v is the escape velocity. As an example, the Sun dynamical time scale is approximately 1133 seconds. Note that the actual time it would take a star like the Sun to collapse is greater because internal pressure is present.

The 'fundamental' oscillatory mode of a star will be at approximately the dynamical time scale. Oscillations at this frequency are seen in Cepheid variables.
