= Measurement microphone calibration =

In order to take a scientific measurement with a microphone, its precise sensitivity must be known (in volts per pascal). Since this may change over the lifetime of the device, it is necessary to regularly calibrate measurement microphones. This service is offered by some microphone manufacturers and by independent testing laboratories. Microphone calibration by certified laboratories should ultimately be traceable to primary standards a (National) Measurement Institute that is a signatory to International Laboratory Accreditation Cooperation. These could include the National Physical Laboratory in the UK, PTB in Germany, NIST in the USA and the National Measurement Institute, Australia, where the reciprocity calibration (see below) is the internationally recognised means of realising the primary standard. Laboratory standard microphones calibrated using this method are used in-turn to calibrate other microphones using comparison calibration techniques (‘secondary calibration’), referencing the output of the ‘test’ microphone against that of the reference laboratory standard microphone.

A microphone’s sensitivity varies with frequency (as well as with other factors such as environmental conditions) and is therefore normally recorded as several sensitivity values, each for a specific frequency band (see frequency spectrum). A microphone’s sensitivity can also depend on the nature of the sound field it is exposed to. For this reason, microphones are often calibrated in more than one sound field, for example a pressure field and a free field. Depending on their application, measurement microphones must be tested periodically (every year or several months, typically), and after any potentially damaging event, such as being dropped or exposed to sound levels beyond the device’s operational range.

== Reciprocity calibration ==
Reciprocity calibration is currently the favoured primary standard for calibration of measurement microphones. The technique exploits the reciprocal nature of certain transduction mechanisms such as the electrostatic transducer principle used in condenser measurement microphones. In order to carry out a reciprocity calibration, three uncalibrated microphones $i$, $j$ and $k$ are used. Microphones $i$ and $j$ are placed facing each other with a well known acoustical coupler between their diaphragms, allowing the acoustic transfer impedance $Z_{\text{ac}}$ to be easily modelled. One of the microphones is then driven by a current $I_i$ to act as the source of sound and the other responds to the pressure generated in the coupler, producing an output voltage $U_j$ resulting in the electrical transfer impedance $Z_{ij}$. Provided that the microphones are reciprocal in behaviour, which means the open circuit sensitivity in V/Pa as a receiver is the same as the sensitivity in m^{3}/s/A as a transmitter, it can be shown that the product of the transmission factors $M_i$, $M_j$, and the acoustical transfer impedance equals the electrical transfer impedance.

$$Z_{ij} = \frac{U_j}{I_i} = M_i \; Z_{\text{ac}} \; M_j$$

Having determined the product of the transmission factors for one pair of microphones, the process is repeated with the other two possible pair-wise combinations $ik$ and $jk$. The set of three measurements then allows the individual microphone transmission factor to be deduced by solving three simultaneous equations.

$$M_i = \sqrt{\frac{1}{Z_{\text{ac}}}\frac{Z_{ij}Z_{ik}}{Z_{jk}}}$$

The electrical transfer impedance is determined during the calibration procedure by measuring the current and voltage and the acoustic transfer impedance depends on the acoustical coupler.

$$Z_{\text{ac}} = \frac{p}{Q} = \frac{F}{vS^2}$$

Commonly used acoustical couplers are free field, diffuse field and compression chamber. For free field conditions between the two microphones the sound pressure in the far field can be calculated and it follows

$$Z_{\text{ac},\,\text{free}} = \frac{\rho_0 \omega}{4 \pi r} e^{-\frac{m}{2}r} e^{-j(kr-\frac{\pi}{2})}$$

where $r$ is the distance between the microphones. For diffuse field conditions follows

$$Z_{\text{ac},\,\text{diff}} = \frac{\rho_0 \omega}{\sqrt{\pi A}} = \frac{\rho_0 \omega}{4 \pi d_c}$$

where $A$ is the equivalent absorption area and $d_c$ is the critical distance for reverberation. For compression chamber conditions follows

$$Z_{\text{ac},\,\text{comp}} = \frac{\rho_0 c^2}{j \omega V_0}$$

where $V_0$ is the air volume in the chamber.

The technique provides a measurement of the sensitivity of a microphone without the need for comparison with another previously calibrated microphone, and is instead traceable to reference electrical quantities such as volts and ohms, as well as length, mass and time. Although a given calibrated microphone will often have been calibrated by other (secondary) methods, all can be traced (through a process of dissemination) back to a microphone calibrated using the reciprocity method at a National Measurement Institute. Reciprocity calibration is a specialist process, and because it forms the basis of the primary standard for sound pressure, many national measurement institutes have invested significant research efforts to refine the method and develop calibration facilities. A system is also commercially available from Brüel & Kjær.

For airborne acoustics, the reciprocity technique is currently the most precise method available for microphone calibration (i.e. has the smallest uncertainty of measurement). Free field reciprocity calibration (to give the free-field response, as opposed to the pressure response of the microphone) follows the same principles and roughly the same method as pressure reciprocity calibration, but in practice is much more difficult to implement. As such it is more usual to perform reciprocity calibration in an acoustical coupler, and then apply a correction if the microphone is to be used in free-field conditions; such corrections are standardised for laboratory standard microphones (IEC/TS 61094-7) and are generally available from the manufacturers of most of the common microphone types.

== Calibration using pistonphones and sound calibrators ==
A pistonphone is an acoustical calibrator (sound source) that uses a closed coupling volume to generate a precise sound pressure for the calibration of measurement microphones. The principle relies on a piston mechanically driven to move at a specified cyclic rate, pushing on a fixed volume of air to which the microphone under test is coupled. The air is assumed to be compressed adiabatically and the sound pressure level in the chamber can, potentially, be calculated from internal physical dimensions of the device and the adiabatic gas law, which requires that PVγ is a constant, where P is the pressure in the chamber, V is the volume of the chamber, and γ is the ratio of the specific heat of air at constant pressure to its specific heat at constant volume. Pistonphones are highly dependent on ambient pressure (always requiring a correction to ambient pressure conditions) and are generally only made to reproduce low frequencies (for practical reasons), typically 250 Hz. However, pistonphones can be very precise, with good stability over time.

However, commercially available pistonphones are not calculable devices and must themselves be calibrated using a calibrated microphone if the results are to be traceable; though generally very stable over time, there will be small differences in the sound pressure level generated between different pistonphones. Since their output is also dependent on the volume of the chamber (coupling volume), differences in shape and load volume between different models of microphone will have an influence on the resulting SPL, requiring the pistonphone to be calibrated accordingly.

Sound calibrators are used in an identical way to pistonphones, providing a known sound pressure field in a cavity to which a test microphone is coupled. Sound calibrators are different from pistonphones in that they work electronically and use a low-impedance (electrodynamic) source to yield a high degree of volume independent operation. Furthermore, modern devices often use a feedback mechanism to monitor and adjust the sound pressure level in the cavity so that it is constant regardless of the cavity / microphone size. Sound calibrators normally generate a 1 kHz sine tone; 1 kHz is chosen since the A-weighted SPL is equal to the linear level at 1 kHz. Sound calibrators should also be calibrated regularly at a nationally accredited calibration laboratory to ensure traceability. Sound calibrators tend to be less precise than pistonphones, but are (nominally) independent of internal cavity volume and ambient pressure.
