= International Organization of Legal Metrology =

- Abbreviation: OIML
- Formation: 1955; 71 years ago
- Type: IGO
- Legal status: Treaty
- Purpose: Legal metrology
- Headquarters: Paris, France
- Region served: World
- Members: Sovereign states
- Official language: English, French
- Budget: €2 million
- Website: www.oiml.org

The International Organization of Legal Metrology (French: Organisation Internationale de Métrologie Légale - OIML), is an intergovernmental organisation that was created in 1955 to promote the global harmonisation of the legal metrology procedures that underpin and facilitate international trade.

Such harmonisation ensures that certification of measuring devices in one country is compatible with certification in another, thereby facilitating trade in the measuring devices and in products that rely on the measuring devices. Such products include weighing devices, taxi meters, speedometers, agricultural measuring devices such as cereal moisture meters, health related devices such as exhaust measurements and alcohol content of drinks.

Since its establishment, the OIML has developed a number of guidelines to assist its Members, particularly developing nations, to draw up appropriate legislation concerning metrology across all facets of society and guidelines on certification and calibration requirements of new products, particularly where such calibration has a legal impact such as in trade, health care and taxation.

The OIML works closely with other international organisations such as the International Bureau of Weights and Measures (BIPM) and International Organization for Standardization (ISO) to ensure compatibility between each organisation's work. The OIML has no legal authority to impose solutions on its Members, but its Recommendations are often used by Member States as part of their own national legislation.

As of May 2024, 64 countries had signed up as Member States and a further 63 as Corresponding (non-voting) Members including all the G20, EU and BRICS countries. Between them, the OIML Members cover 86 % of the world's population and 96 % of its economy.

The Headquarters of the OIML is located in Paris, France.

== Definition of "legal metrology" ==
The definition of "legal metrology" varies amongst jurisdictions, reflecting the extent to which metrology is bound into the jurisdiction's own legal and regulatory code. The OIML, in their publication International Vocabulary of Terms in Legal Metrology defined "legal metrology" as

... concerns regulatory requirements of measurements and measuring instruments for the protection of health, public safety, the environment, enabling taxation, protection of consumers and fair trade.

In the glossary of their book Metrology - in short Howarth and Redgrave state that "legal metrology"

Ensures accuracy and reliability of measurement where measured values can affect health, safety, or the transparency of financial transactions e.g. weights and measures.

These two statements are held together by the words "regulatory", "accuracy" and "reliability". The word "regulatory" encompasses the "legal" aspects of the term – the role played by governments, national metrology institutes and standards organisations in creating a framework to ensure confidence in the accuracy and reliability of a measurement. This framework requires that the specified test and conformance operations are carried out, and that the certificates pertaining to these operations are filed in a manner that enables third parties to assess them should the need arise.

The OIML has identified four main activities that fulfil the purposes of legal metrology:

- Setting up of legal requirements,
- Control/conformity assessment of regulated products and regulated activities,
- Supervision of regulated products and of regulated activities,
- Providing the necessary infrastructure for correct measurements.

== History ==
The International Organization of Legal Metrology (OIML), an intergovernmental organisation, was established under a diplomatic treaty signed in Paris on 12 October 1955 to promote the global harmonisation of legal metrology procedures that underpin and facilitate international trade. Under French law, its principal body, the International Conference on Legal Metrology, is accorded diplomatic status.

The Convention that set up the OIML listed eight objectives behind its establishment. At the 2011 meeting in Prague of the International Committee of Legal Metrology (CIML), the OIML updated its mission to read:

The mission of the OIML is to enable economies to put in place effective legal metrology infrastructures that are mutually compatible and internationally recognised, for all areas for which governments take responsibility, such as those which facilitate trade, establish mutual confidence and harmonise the level of consumer protection worldwide.

At the same meeting, its objectives were then stated as follows:

1. "To develop, in cooperation with our stakeholders, standards and related documents for use by legal metrology authorities and industry that when implemented will achieve the mission of the OIML".
2. "To provide mutual recognition systems which reduce trade barriers and costs in a global market".
3. "To represent the interests of the legal metrology community within international organisations and forums concerned with metrology, standardisation, testing, certification and accreditation".
4. "To promote and facilitate the exchange of knowledge and competencies within the legal metrology community worldwide".
5. "In co-operation with other metrology bodies, to raise awareness of the contribution that a sound legal metrology infrastructure can make to a modern economy".
6. "To identify areas for the OIML to improve the effectiveness and efficiency of its work".

== Structure ==
The OIML, which has an annual operating budget of about two million euros that comes from Member subscriptions (Note: Subscriptions currently range from €1 400 for Corresponding Members to €112 000 for Member States that have a population of over 100 million.) is organised around a three-layer model:

The overall direction of the OIML is vested in the International Conference (French: Conférence internationale de Métrologie légale) which meets every four years. The Conference is attended by delegations from Member States and [non-voting] Corresponding Members of the Organisation.

The management of the OIML is vested in the International Committee (French: Comité international de Métrologie légale - CIML). The Committee consists of one member from each Member State. These members normally have active official functions in legal metrology in their country. The Committee elects a non-salaried President for a six-year term of office from amongst its Members. The Committee meets annually under the chairmanship of its President.

Secretarial services, day-to-day running and financial management of the OIML are provided by the BIML (French: Bureau International de Métrologie légale). The BIML is the OIML headquarters, located in the 9th Arrondissement of Paris and is headed by a salaried director who is, ex-officio, secretary to both the International Conference and the International Committee.

=== Senior postholders ===
CIML Presidents

- 1956-1962 M. Jacob (Belgium)
- 1962-1968 J. Stulla-Götz (Austria)
- 1968-1980 A. van Male (Netherlands)
- 1980-1994 K. Birkeland (Norway)
- 1994-2003 G. Faber (Netherlands)
- 2003-2005 M. Kochsiek (Germany - Acting President )
- 2005-2011 A. Johnston (Canada)
- 2011-2017 P. Mason (United Kingdom)
- 2017-2023 R. Schwartz (Germany)
- 2023-date B. Mathew (Switzerland)

BIML Directors

- 1956-1973 M.V.D. Costamagna
- 1974-2001 B. Athané
- 2001-2010 J-F. Magaña
- 2011-2018 S. Patoray
- 2019-date A. Donnellan

== Participation and membership ==
The OIML has two categories of membership; "Member State" and "Corresponding Member". The Member State category is for countries or economies that are prepared to finance and actively participate in the work of the OIML and which have acceded to the OIML Convention.

The Corresponding Member category is for countries or economies that want to be informed of OIML activities, but cannot, or prefer not to, be a Member State. As of May 2024, a total of 64 states are Member States and 63 are Corresponding Members.

Member States

Albania
Algeria
Australia
Austria
Belarus
Belgium
Brazil
Bulgaria
Cambodia
Canada
Colombia
China
Croatia
Cuba
Cyprus
Czech Republic
Denmark
Egypt
Ethiopia
Finland
France
Germany
Greece
Hungary
India
Indonesia
Iran
Ireland
Israel
Italy
Japan
Kazakhstan
Kenya
Korea
Monaco
Montenegro
Morocco
Netherlands
New Zealand
North Macedonia
Norway
Pakistan
Poland
Portugal
Romania
Russia
Saudi Arabia
Serbia
Slovakia
Slovenia
South Africa
Spain
Sri Lanka
Sweden
Switzerland
Tanzania
Thailand
Tunisia
Turkey
Ukraine
United Kingdom
United States
Vietnam
Zambia

Corresponding Members

Angola
Argentina
Azerbaijan
Bahrain
Bangladesh
Barbados
Benin
Bolivia
Bosnia and Herzegovina
Botswana
Burkina Faso
Chinese Taipei
Costa Rica
Djibouti
Dominican Republic
Ecuador
Estonia
Fiji
Gabon
Georgia
Ghana
Guatemala
Guinea
Guyana
Hong Kong
Iceland
Iraq
Jordan
Kiribati
Kuwait
Kyrgyzstan
Latvia
Lithuania
Luxembourg
Madagascar
Malawi
Malaysia
Mali
Malta
Mauritius
Mexico
Moldova
Mongolia
Mozambique
Namibia
Nepal
Nigeria
Oman
Panama
Papua New Guinea
Paraguay
Peru
Philippines
Qatar
Rwanda
Saint Lucia
Seychelles
Sierra Leone
Singapore
Sudan
Trinidad and Tobago
Uganda
United Arab Emirates
Uruguay
Uzbekistan

== Work ==
=== Technical Committees ===
The technical work of the OIML is carried out by Technical Committees (TC), each committee having responsibility for a different aspect of legal metrology. In some cases the Technical Committee is broken up into one or more Subcommittees (SC). Within each TC or SC the actual technical work is carried out by Project Groups led by conveners. TCs, SCs and Project Groups are led by volunteer experts from OIML Member States. As of March 2022 there are 18 Technical Committees and 46 Subcommittees. The Technical Committees are:

- TC 1 Terminology
- TC 2 Units of measurement
- TC 3 Metrological control (5 SCs)
- TC 4 Measurement standards and calibration and verification devices
- TC 5 General requirements for measuring instruments (2 SCs)
- TC 6 Prepackaged products
- TC 7 Measuring instruments for length and associated quantities (4 SCs)
- TC 8 Measurement of quantities of fluids (5 SCs)
- TC 9 Instruments for measuring mass and density (4 SCs)
- TC 10 Instruments for measuring pressure, force and associated quantities (5 SCs)
- TC 11 Instruments for measuring temperature and associated quantities (3 SCs)
- TC 12 Instruments for measuring electrical quantities
- TC 13 Measuring instruments for acoustics and vibration
- TC 14 Measuring instruments used for optics
- TC 15 Measuring instruments for ionizing radiations (2 SCs)
- TC 16 Instruments for measuring pollutants (4 SCs)
- TC 17 Instruments for physico-chemical measurements (8 SCs)
- TC 18 Medical measuring instruments (3 SCs)

=== Publications ===
The OIML produces a number of publications, including:

Vocabularies (prefixed by the letter "V") that provide standardised terminology in the field of metrology. The OIML has produced two principal works:

- International Vocabulary of Terms in Legal Metrology (VIML) which defines the terms used in legal metrology. The first edition of this work (1978) was the joint effort of seven international organisations - BIPM, IEC, IFCC, ISO, IUPAC, IUPAP and the OIML.
- Alphabetical list of terms defined in OIML Recommendations and Documents which defines the technical terms used in the various OIML Recommendations.

In addition, the OIML was a partner in the JCGM (Note: The Joint Committee for Guides in Metrology (JCGM) has eight members: BIPM, IEC, IFCC, ISO, IUPAC, IUPAP, ILAC and the OIML.) which produced the International vocabulary of metrology - Basic and general concepts and associated terms (VIM), a document published by the BIPM on behalf of the JCGM

Recommendations (prefixed by the letter "R") which are model regulations that establish the metrological characteristics required of certain measuring instruments and which specify methods and equipment for checking their conformity. Most of the Recommendations have a similar structure. The four main topics covered in the reports are metrological requirements, technical requirements, methods and equipment for testing and verifying conformity to requirements and test report format. Recommendations are written in such a manner that they can be adopted "as is" by countries that wish to do so, or countries can select those parts that they wish to include in their own legislation. As of March 2022 104 Recommendations have been published, usually in both English and French. Recommendations may be downloaded free of charge from the OIML website.

International Documents (prefixed by the letter "D"), which are informative in nature and intended to improve the work of the metrological services. As of March 2022 31 OIML Documents had been published in this series. Documents may be downloaded free of charge from the OIML website.

The OIML also published Basic Publications, Guides, Seminar Reports, Expert Reports and the OIML Bulletin.

=== OIML Certification System (OIML-CS) ===
The OIML-CS is a single Certification System comprising two Schemes: Scheme A and Scheme B. It was launched on 1 January 2018, replacing the OIML Basic Certificate System and the OIML Mutual Acceptance Arrangement (MAA).

The aim of the OIML-CS is to facilitate, accelerate and harmonise the work of national and regional bodies that are responsible for type evaluation and approval of measuring instruments subject to legal metrological control.

The objectives of the OIML-CS are

a) to promote the global harmonisation, uniform interpretation and implementation of legal metrological requirements for measuring instruments and/or modules,

b) to avoid unnecessary re-testing when obtaining national type evaluations and approvals, and to support the recognition of measuring instruments and/or modules under legal metrological control, while achieving and maintaining confidence in the results in support of facilitating the global trade of individual instruments, and

c) to establish rules and procedures for fostering mutual confidence among participating OIML Member States and Corresponding Members in the results of type evaluations that indicate conformity of measuring instruments and/or modules, under legal metrological control, to the metrological and technical requirements established in the applicable OIML Recommendation(s).

There are three categories of participants:

- OIML Issuing Authorities are participants from Member States that issue OIML type evaluation reports and OIML Certificates under the OIML-CS.
- Utilizers are participants from OML Member States that accept and utilise OIML Certificates and/or OIML type evaluation reports issued by OIML Issuing Authorities.
- Associates are participants from Corresponding Members that accept and utilise OIML Certificates and/or OIML type evaluation reports issued by OIML Issuing Authorities. Associates do not have voting rights in the Management Committee.

The requirements for the participation of OIML Issuing Authorities and their associated Test Laboratories in Scheme A or Scheme B are the same, but the method of demonstrating compliance is different. OIML Issuing Authorities are required to demonstrate compliance with ISO/IEC 17065 and Test Laboratories are required to demonstrate compliance with ISO/IEC 17025. For participation in Scheme B, it is sufficient to demonstrate compliance on the basis of “self-declaration” with additional supporting evidence. However, for participation in Scheme A, compliance shall be demonstrated by peer evaluation on the basis of accreditation or peer assessment.

== Relationships ==
The work of the OIML overlaps with the work of a number of other international organisations. In order to minimise the impact of this overlap and also to ensure that the work of the OIML and other organisations can intermesh with each other, the OIML and other organisations have exchanged memoranda of understanding (MoU) with each other. As of October 2024 the MoU in existence were:

- On 3 December 2008 the International Bureau of Weights and Measures (BIPM), the United Nations Industrial Development Organization (UNIDO) and the OIML signed a three-way MoU whereby each would apply their own expertise in the best way possible to ensure the better implementation of capacity building activities in standards and conformity, as well as compliance with sanitary and phytosanitary (SPS) measures.
- An MoU was signed with the International Organization for Standardization (ISO) on 10 June 1966, which was revised on 9 December 2008 whereby both organisations would cooperate via joint technical committees where applicable. A number of OIML Recommendations that were at variance with certain ISO standards were withdrawn. A process to fast-track OIML Recommendations into ISO standards was also agreed. Joint reports issued by both organisations could be downloaded from the OIML website as with any other OIML document. (Note: This has financial implications as the OIML is funded mainly by member subscriptions and ISO by the sale of standards.)
- An MoU was signed with the International Electrotechnical Commission (IEC) on 13 October 2011 during the 46th CIML Meeting in Prague. Under the MoU, the two organisations agreed to keep each other informed of their activities, and where appropriate, to set up joint technical committees and issue joint recommendations. On 10 October 2018 at the 53rd CIML Meeting, held in Hamburg, Germany, a renewed MoU was signed by Mr. Frans Vreeswijk (General Secretary and CEO of the IEC) and Dr. Roman Schwartz (CIML President). On 14 November 2023 at the IEC Secretariat in Geneva, Switzerland, a renewed MoU between the IEC and the OIML was signed by Mr Philippe Metzger (General Secretary and CEO of the IEC) and Dr Bobjoseph Mathew (CIML President).
- An MoU was signed with the International Laboratory Accreditation Cooperation (ILAC) on 12 November 2006 whereby ILAC and OIML would cooperate in the use of the OIML Mutual Acceptance Arrangement (MAA) tool and both organisations would cooperate in the field of harmonisation of accreditation by ILAC full members and peer assessments organised by the BIML. On 28 October 2007, during the ILAC/IAF General Assembly in Sydney, the MoU was extended to include the International Accreditation Forum (IAF) whereby ILAC and the OIML would cooperate in the use of the OIML Mutual Acceptance Arrangement (MAA) tool and both organisations would cooperate in the field of harmonisation of accreditation by ILAC full members and peer assessments organised by the document Guide for the application of ISO/IEC Guide 65 to legal metrology was to be revised to bring it into line with other ISO standards, notably ISO 17021 and ISO 9001.

== See also ==
- Measurement Canada
- WELMEC
