= Dimensional metrology =

Specialization

Dimensional metrology, also known as industrial metrology, is the application of metrology for quantifying the physical size, form (shape), characteristics, and relational distance from any given feature.

== History ==
Standardized measurements are essential to technological advancement, and early measurement tools have been found dating back to the dawn of human civilization. Early Mesopotamian and Egyptian metrologists created a set of measurement standards based on body parts known as anthropic units. These ancient systems of measurements utilized fingers, palms, hands, feet, and paces as intervals.

Carpenters and surveyors were some of the first dimensional inspectors, and many specialized units of craftsmen, such as the remen, were worked into a system of unit fractions that allowed for calculations utilizing analytic geometry. Later agricultural measures such as feet, yards, paces, cubits, fathoms, rods, cords, perch, stadia, miles and degrees of the Earth's circumference, many of which are still in use.

=== Early measurement tools and standardization ===
Early Egyptian rulers were incremented in units of fingers, palms, and feet based on standardized inscription grids. These grids outlined the standards of measurement as canons of proportion and were made commensurate with Mesopotamian standards based on fingers, hands, and feet. In this system, four palms or three hands measured one foot; ten hands equaled one meter.

These standards were used to measure and define property and were regulated by law for several purposes, such as taxation, infrastructure, and more, such as buildings and fields were adopted by the Greeks, Romans, and Persians as legal standards and became the basis of European standards of measure. They were also used to relate length to area with units such as the khet, setat and aroura; area to volume with units such as the artaba; and space to time with units such as the Egyptian minute of march, which was recorded on travel on a river.

== Modern tools ==
Modern measurement equipment includes hand tools, CMMs (coordinate-measuring machines), machine vision systems, laser trackers, and optical comparators. A CMM is based on CNC technology to automate measurement of Cartesian coordinates using a touch probe, contact scanning probe, or non-contact sensor. Optical comparators are used when physically touching the part is undesirable; components that consist of fragile or mailable materials require measurement using non-contact techniques. Instruments can now build 3D models of a part and its internal features using CT scanning or X-ray imaging.

== Relative measurements ==
Measurements are often expressed as a size relative to a theoretically perfect part that has its geometry defined in a print or computer model. A print is a blueprint illustrating the defined geometry of a part and its features. Each feature can have a size, a distance from other features, and an allowed tolerance set for each element. The international language used to describe physical parts is called Geometric Dimensioning and Tolerancing (colloquially known as GD&T). Prints can be hand-drawn or automatically generated by a computer CAD model. However, computer-controlled measurement machines like coordinate measuring machines (CMMs) and vision measuring machines (VMMs) can measure a part relative to a CAD model without the need for a print. Typically, this process is done to reverse engineer components.

== Mechanical engineering ==
Industrial metrology is common in manufacturing quality control systems to help identify errors in component production and ensure proper performance. Blueprints and 3D CAD models are usually made by a mechanical engineer.

== See also ==
- Position sensor
- Positioning system
