= Dodge Caravan =

Series of minivans made by Chrysler

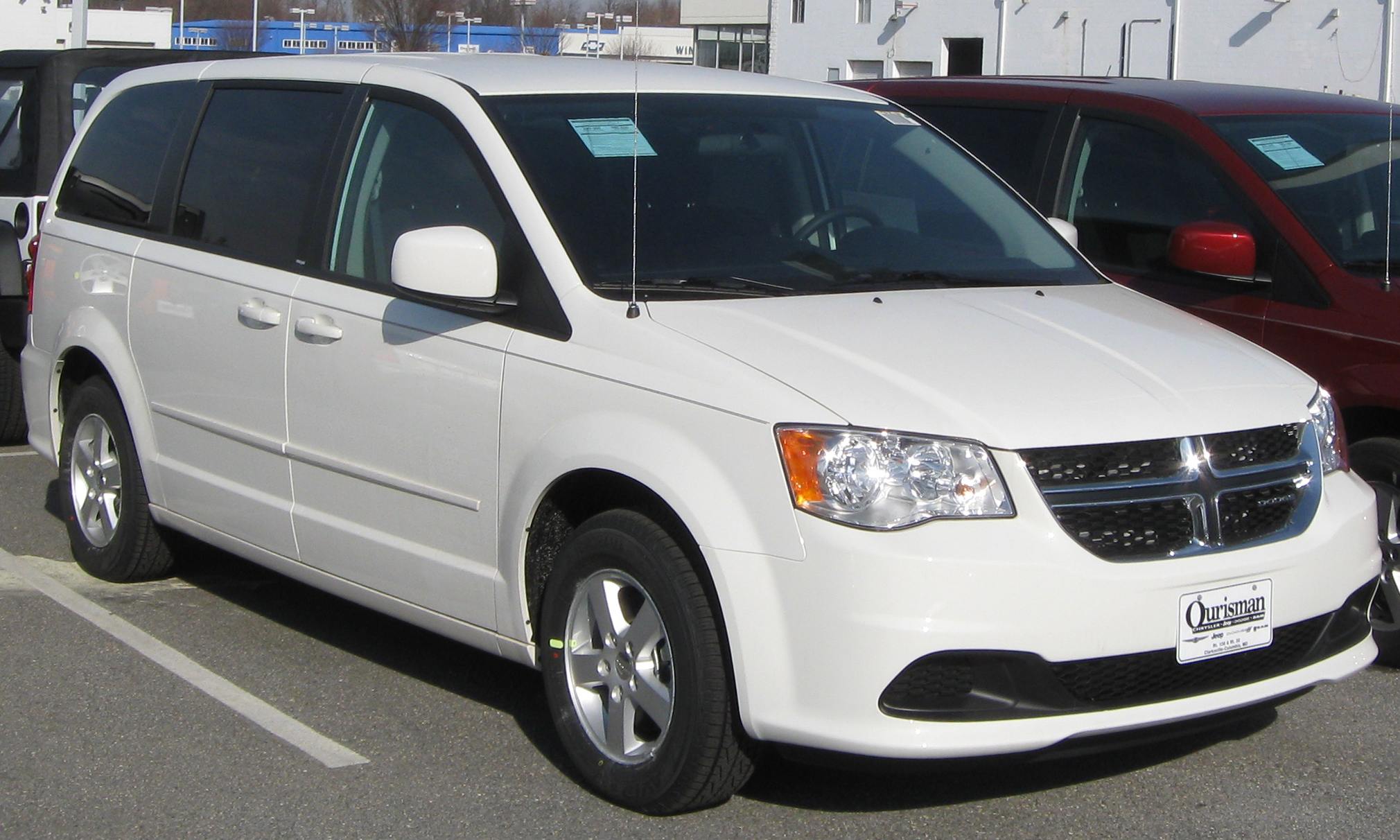
- 2011 Dodge Grand Caravan Mainstreet

Overview
- Manufacturer: Chrysler Corporation (1984–1998); DaimlerChrysler (1998–2007); Chrysler LLC (2007–2009); Chrysler Group LLC (2009–2014); FCA US LLC (2014–2020)
- Production: November 2, 1983 –August 21, 2020
- Model years: 1984–2020
- Assembly: Windsor, Ontario, Canada (Windsor Assembly: 1983–2020); Fenton, Missouri (St. Louis North Assembly Plant: 1987–1995); Fenton, Missouri (St. Louis South Assembly Plant: 1996–2009); Fuzhou, China (Soueast: 2007–2011)

Body and chassis
- Class: Minivan
- Layout: Front-engine, front-wheel drive; Front-engine, all-wheel drive (1992–2004)
- Related: Plymouth Voyager; Chrysler Town & Country; Dodge Mini Ram; Chrysler Voyager; Volkswagen Routan

Chronology
- Successor: Dodge Journey (SWB); Chrysler Voyager (LWB) (for Grand Caravan Nameplate In Canada)

The Dodge Caravan is a series of minivans manufactured by Chrysler from the 1984 through 2020 model years. The Dodge version of the Chrysler minivans was marketed as both a passenger van and a cargo van (the only version of the model line offered in the latter configuration). For 1987, the model line was joined by the long-wheelbase Dodge Grand Caravan. Produced in five generations across 36 model years, the Dodge Caravan is the second longest-lived Dodge nameplate (exceeded only by the Dodge Charger). Initially marketed as the Dodge counterpart of the Plymouth Voyager, the Caravan was later slotted between the Voyager and the Chrysler Town & Country. Following the demise of Plymouth, the model line became the lowest-price Chrysler minivan, ultimately slotted below the Chrysler Pacifica.

Sold primarily in the United States and Canada, the Dodge Caravan was also marketed in Europe and other international markets under the Chrysler brand (as the Chrysler Voyager or Chrysler Caravan). From 2008 onward, Dodge marketed the model line only as the Grand Caravan; Ram Trucks sold a cargo-only version of the model line as the Ram C/V Tradesman. The model line was also rebranded as the Volkswagen Routan from 2009 to 2014.

After the 2020 model year, the Dodge Grand Caravan was discontinued, ending production on August 21, 2020. For 2021 production, the Grand Caravan nameplate was moved to Chrysler, which used it for a Canadian-market version of the Chrysler Pacifica (in the United States, the exact vehicle was marketed as the Chrysler Voyager).

For its entire production run, the Dodge Caravan/Grand Caravan was manufactured by Chrysler Canada (now Stellantis Canada) at its Windsor Assembly facility (Windsor, Ontario). From 1987 to 2007, the model line was also manufactured by Chrysler at its Saint Louis Assembly facility (Fenton, Missouri). Since their introduction in late 1983, over 14.6 million Chrysler minivans have been sold worldwide (including export versions and versions sold through rebranding).

== Background ==
At the end of 1977, Chrysler commenced development on what would become the Chrysler minivans. Alongside the ability to park within a standard-height garage, designers sought to develop a vehicle with a low floor and car-like NVH levels. While front-wheel drive was sought out for the design, rear-wheel drive was still considered an alternative for cost reasons. Following the move of both Hal Sperlich and Lee Iacocca from Ford to Chrysler in late 1978, the Chrysler minivan design (codenamed T-115 at the time) adopted front-wheel drive.

While the Dodge Caravan (and Plymouth Voyager) shared no chassis underpinnings with the K-cars, the two model lines retained mechanical commonality, sharing engines and transmissions.

== First generation (1984–1990) ==
First generation
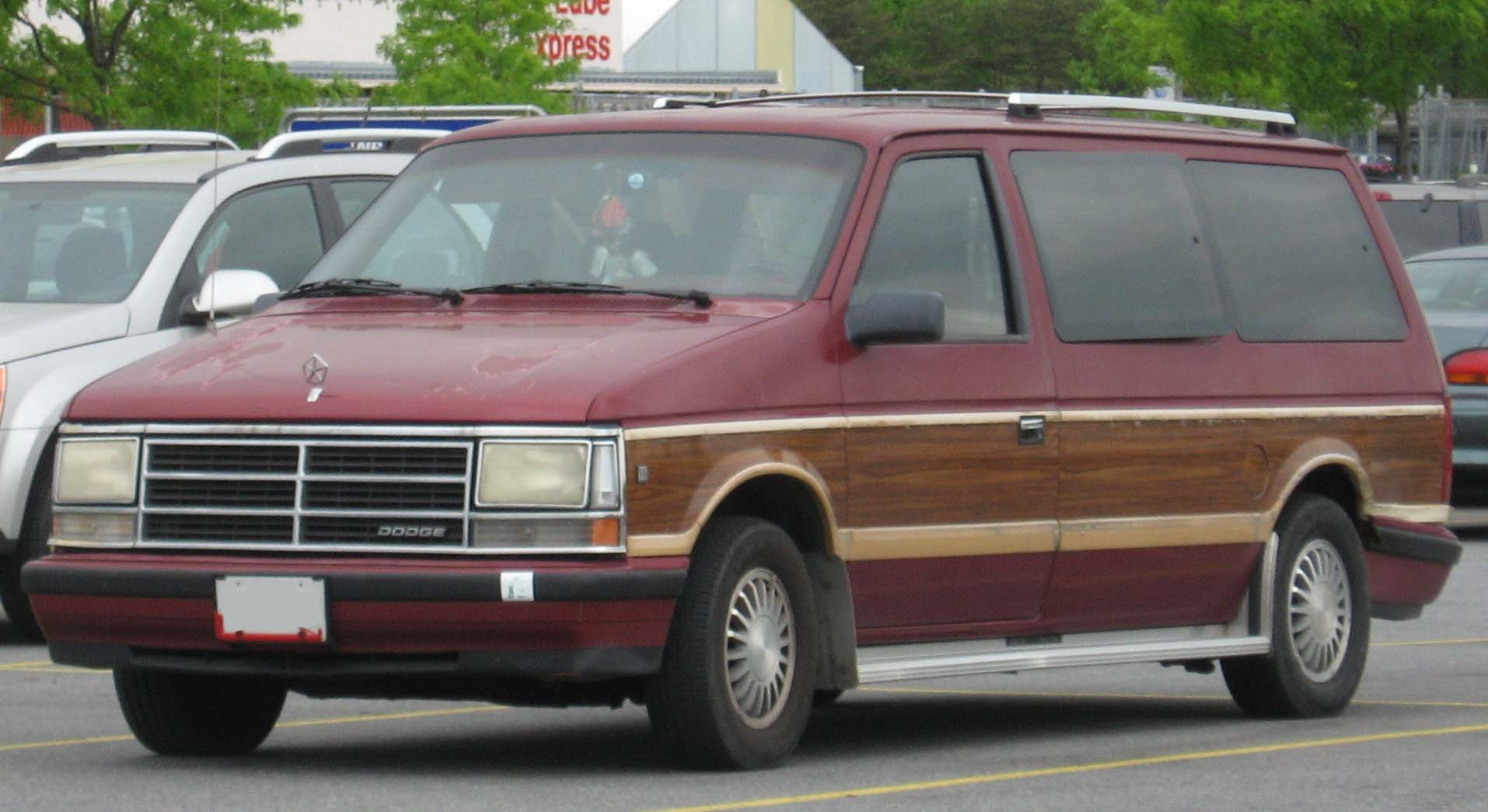

Overview
- Also called: Dodge Grand Caravan (LWB Model); Dodge Caravan (SWB Model)
- Production: October 1983–1990
- Model years: 1984–1990
- Designer: Bob Hubbach (1980)

Body and chassis
- Body style: 3-door minivan
- Layout: Transverse front-engine, front-wheel drive
- Platform: Chrysler S platform
- Related: Chrysler Town & Country; Plymouth Voyager; Dodge Mini Ram; Chrysler Voyager (Europe only)

Powertrain
- Engine: 2.2 L K I4; 2.5 L K I4; 2.5 L K turbo I4; 2.6 L Mitsubishi G54B I4; 3.0 L Mitsubishi 6G72 V6; 3.3 L EGA V6
- Transmission: 4-speed A460 manual 5-speed manual 3-speed A413 automatic 3-speed A470 automatic 3-speed A670 automatic 4-speed A604 automatic

Dimensions
- Wheelbase: 1984–1988 SWB: 112.1 in (2,847 mm); Grand Caravan & C/V Extended: 119.1 in (3,025 mm); 1989–1990 SWB & C/V: 112 in (2,844.8 mm)
- Length: SWB & C/V: 175.9 in (4,468 mm); Grand Caravan: 190.5 in (4,839 mm); 1989–1990 LE SWB: 177.3 in (4,503 mm); 1989–1990 Grand Caravan LE: 191.9 in (4,874 mm); C/V Extended: 190.6 in (4,841 mm)
- Width: 1984–1988: 69.5 in (1,765 mm); 1989–1990: 72 in (1,829 mm)
- Height: 1984–1988 SWB: 64.4 in (1,636 mm); 1987–1988 Grand Caravan: 65 in (1,651 mm); C/V: 64.2 in (1,631 mm); 1989–1990 SWB: 64.6 in (1,641 mm); 1989–1990 Grand Caravan: 64.8 in (1,646 mm)

Initially slated for introduction as a 1982 model, the Dodge Caravan was introduced alongside the Plymouth Voyager in November 1983 for the 1984 model year.

Interior trim, controls, and instrumentation were borrowed from the Chrysler K platform, and with the lower floor made possible by the front-wheel-drive platform, the Caravan featured car-like ease of entry. Three trim levels were available: base, SE, and LE. The Caravan and Voyager are considered to be the first mass-produced vehicles to have dedicated, built-in cup holders.

Base models came equipped for five passengers in two rows of seating. The LE came with seven passengers standard in three rows of seating. The base van had two bucket seats with attached armrests and open floor space between them in the front and a three-person bench seat in the second row. The seven-passenger included two bucket seats with attached armrests and open floor space between them in the front, a two-person bench seat in the second row, and a three-person bench seat in the back row. The two bench seats in the rear were independently removable, and the large three-person bench could also be installed in the second-row location via a second set of attachment points on the van's floor, ordinarily hidden with snap-in plastic covers. This configuration allowed for conventional five-person seating with a sizable cargo area in the rear. The latching mechanisms for the benches were easy to operate, although removing and replacing the seats typically required two adults. A front low-back 60/40 split-bench, accommodating a third front passenger in the middle, was offered exclusively in the SE trim level for 1985, allowing for a maximum of eight passengers. This configuration was subsequently discontinued. The base model's curb weight was 2,910 lb (1,320 kg).

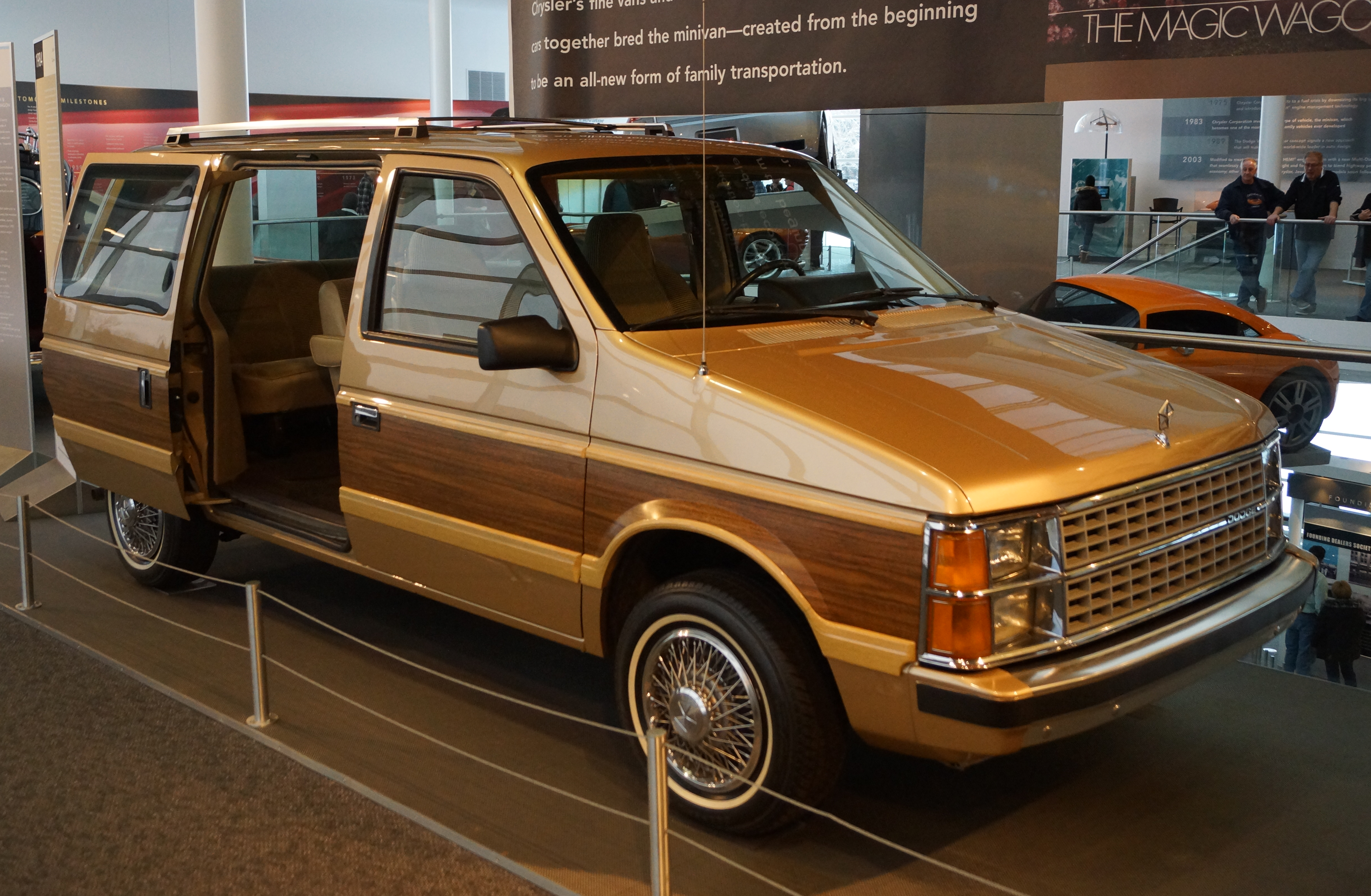
1984 Dodge Caravan LE in the Walter P. Chrysler Museum

Safety features included three-point seat belts for the front two passengers and lap belts for the rear five. The seats on base models and cloth-trimmed SEs had no headrests due to the vehicle's "light truck" classification rather than following standard passenger car safety standards. However, the two front seats included non-adjustable headrests on the LE model and in conjunction with vinyl upholstery on the SE versions. Safety standards mandated side-impact reinforcements at all seating positions, front and rear.

Access to the rear rows of seating was by a large passenger-side sliding door, enabling easy access in confined situations (e.g. parking). Because only one sliding door was offered, the smaller second-row bench seat was shifted to the driver's side of the van, facilitating passenger access to the third-row seat. To facilitate variable cargo storage behind the third-row rear seat, the seat could be adjusted forward in two increments, the first of which reduced legroom for the back row passengers by about 6 inches (150 mm), and the second of which would push the bench to the back of the second row, making the seats unusable. The seatback of the rear bench could also be folded forward, providing a flat cargo shelf. The narrower second-row bench was neither adjustable nor foldable; it could only be removed entirely.

Cargo access to the rear was via a hatchback, similar to the one on the K platform station wagons. The hatch was hinged at the top and held open by gas struts.

A long-wheelbase variant, marketed as the Grand Caravan, was introduced in May 1987. It offered more cargo space behind the third-row seat.

A commercial cargo version of the Caravan, called the Mini Ram Van, was also introduced for 1984, with a flat-floored cargo space offering a four-foot interior height and featuring four feet of space between the rear wheel wells. The load capacity was 1,700 lb (770 kg). It was renamed the Caravan C/V for 1989 and was discontinued after 1995. It was initially available with a short wheelbase; a long-wheelbase variant was introduced alongside the Grand Caravan.

Unique to the Caravan C/V was a traditional hatch door in the back or the optional swing-out bi-parting doors (with or without windows), similar to those of more traditional cargo vans. These doors were made of fiberglass. Also based on the Mini Ram and C/V were aftermarket conversion vans sold through official Chrysler dealers and from the conversion companies themselves.

=== Trim levels ===
- Base – Included: Vinyl upholstery, 5-passenger seating, warning chimes, cigar lighter, digital clock, manual locks, windows and mirrors, 15-gallon fuel tank, tinted windows, halogen headlamps, an AM/FM stereo with four speakers, vinyl steering wheel, and intermittent wipers.
- SE – Added: Cloth upholstery, reclining front seats, rear assist strap, 20-gallon fuel tank, power liftgate release, tape stripes, and steel road wheels.
- LE – Added: Cloth-and-vinyl upholstery, front and rear fascia, forward storage console, warning lights for door ajar, storage drawer, washer fluid warning, and power mirrors.

=== Transmissions ===
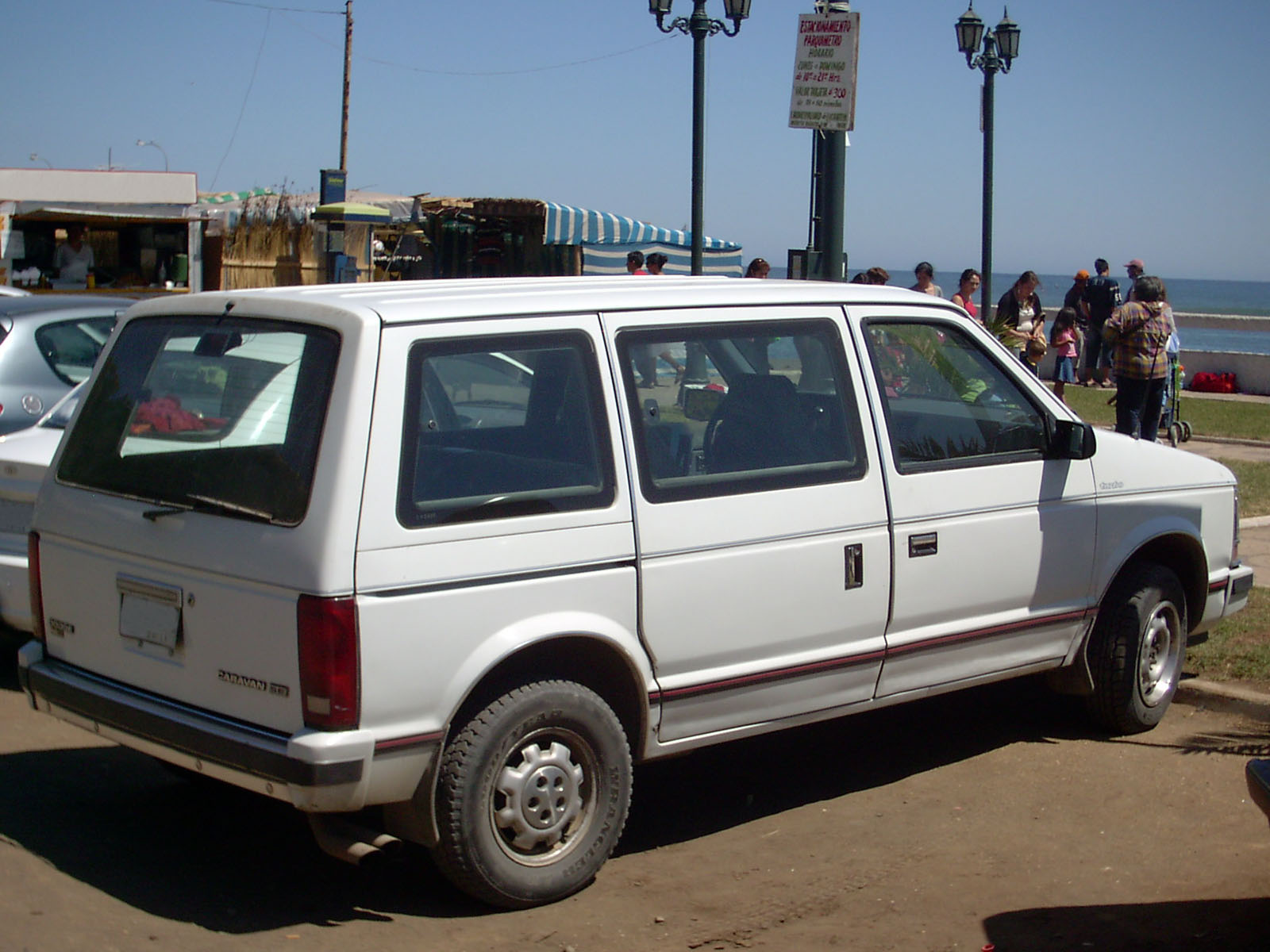
Dodge Caravan SE Turbo (Chile)

Both a 3-speed TorqueFlite automatic transmission and a 5-speed manual were available with all straight-four engines, including the turbocharged 2.5-liter (this was a rare combination). The Plymouth Voyager, which was a rebadged version of the Caravan, was also available with a manual transmission. The Chrysler Town & Country, released in 1990, was a more luxurious repackaged version of the Caravan and had no manual transmission option. Manual transmissions were not available on V6 models of the passenger Caravan, but were an option on the Mini Ram Van and Caravan C/V's long-wheelbase models with a 3.0 L V6.

The V6 engines were only offered with the venerable fully hydraulically operated TorqueFlite, until the computer-controlled Ultradrive 4-speed automatic became available in 1989. The Ultradrive offered better fuel economy and responsiveness, particularly when paired with the inline-four engine. However, it suffered from reliability problems, usually stemming from what is known as "gear hunt" or "shift busyness", resulting in premature wear of the internal clutches. It also required an uncommon type of automatic transmission fluid and is not clearly labeled as such, leading many owners to use the more common Dexron II rather than the specified "Mopar ATF+3", resulting in transmission damage and eventual failure. Early model transmissions would eventually be retrofitted or replaced with the updated versions by dealers under warranty.

=== Engines ===
For the first three years of production, two engines were offered in the Caravan – both straight-four engines with 2-barrel carburetors. The base 2.2 L was borrowed from the Chrysler K-cars, and produced 96 hp (72 kW) horsepower. The higher performance fuel-injected version of the 2.2 L engine later offered in the K-cars was never offered in the Caravan, and the 2-bbl version would remain the base power plant until mid-1987. Alongside the 2.2 L, an optional Mitsubishi 2.6 L engine was available, producing 104 hp (78 kW) horsepower.

In mid-1987, the base 2.2 L I4 was replaced with a fuel-injected 2.5 L I4, which produced 100 hp (75 kW), while the Mitsubishi G54B I4 was replaced with the new fuel-injected 3.0 L Mitsubishi V6 producing 136 hp (101 kW) in March of that year.

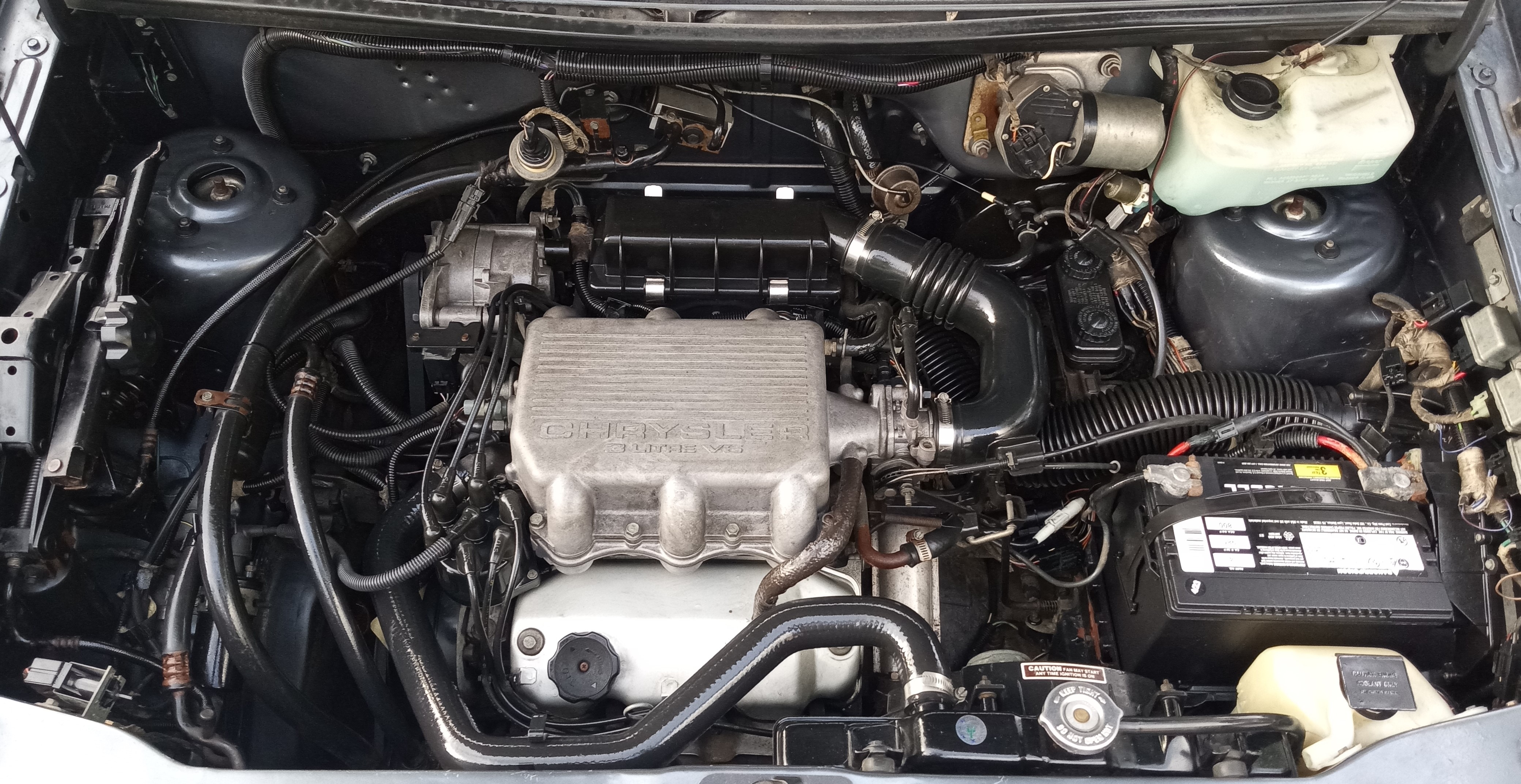
1988 Dodge Caravan 3.0 Liter Engine

Shortly thereafter in model year 1989, a more powerful engine became optional, with a turbocharged version of the base 2.5 L producing 150 hp (112 kW). Revisions to the Mitsubishi V6 upped its output to 142 hp (106 kW) that same year, and in 1990 a new 150 hp (110 kW) 3.3 L V6 was added to the option list. The V6 engines became popular as sales of the 2.5 L turbo dwindled and it was dropped at the end of the year. In these years, the ES model debuted (short-wheelbase only) to highlight the new engines, the turbo 2.5 L in particular. The ES was introduced to the long-wheelbase Grand Caravan for 1991 and continued throughout 2003 before it was discontinued and replaced with the SXT.

- 1984–1987 2.2 L K I4, 96 hp (72 kW), 119 lb⋅ft (161 N⋅m)
- 1984–1987 2.6 L Mitsubishi G54B I4, 104 hp (78 kW), 142 lb⋅ft (193 N⋅m)
- 1987½–1990 2.5 L K I4, 100 hp (75 kW), 135 lb⋅ft (183 N⋅m)
- 1987½–1988 3.0 L Mitsubishi 6G72 V6, 136 hp (101 kW), 168 lb⋅ft (228 N⋅m)
- 1989–1990 2.5 L K Turbo I4, 150 hp (110 kW), 180 lb⋅ft (240 N⋅m)
- 1989–1990 3.0 L Mitsubishi 6G72 V6, 142 hp (106 kW), 173 lb⋅ft (235 N⋅m)
- 1990 3.3 L EGA V6, 150 hp (110 kW), 185 lb⋅ft (251 N⋅m)

== Second generation (1991–1995) ==
Second generation
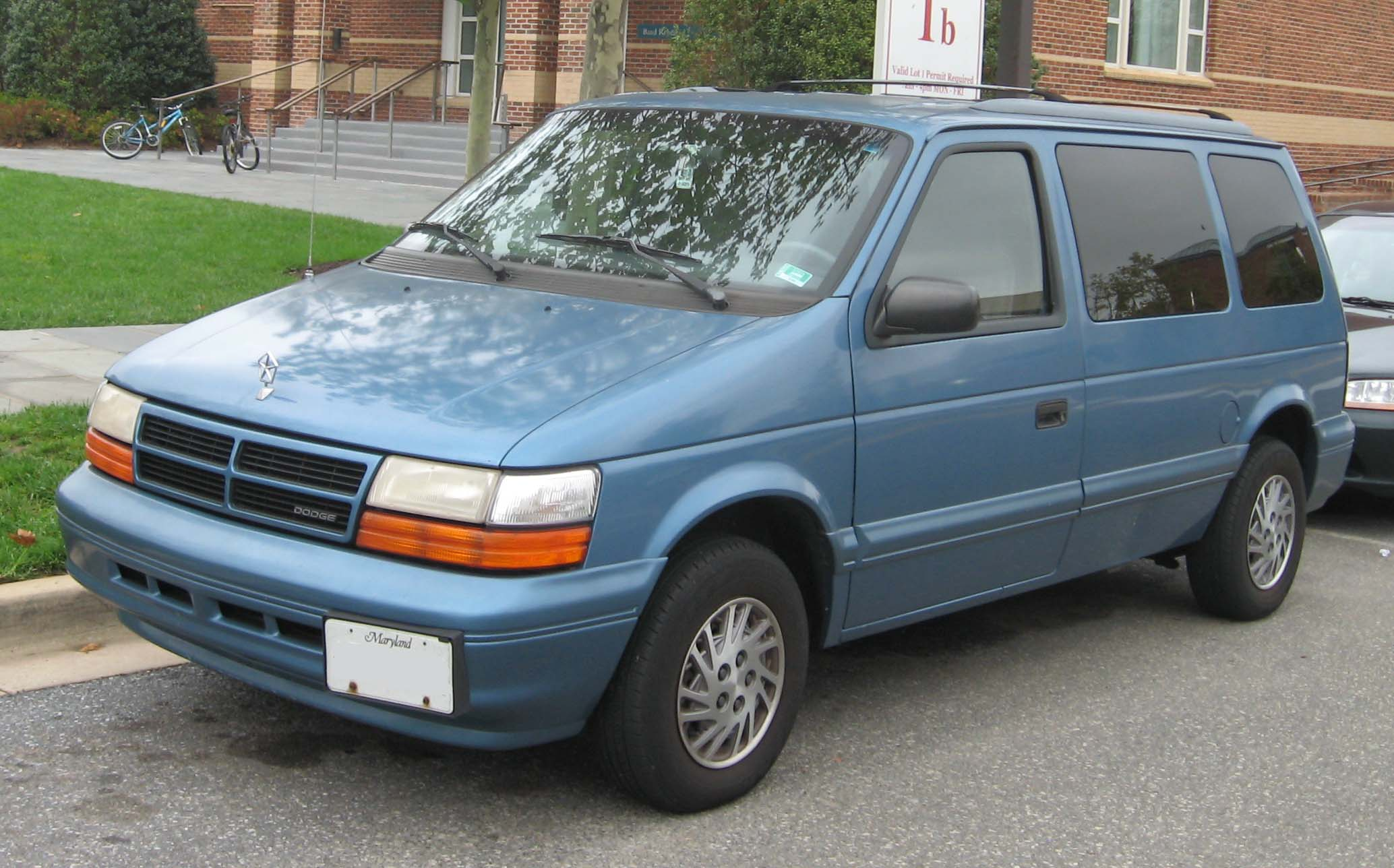

Overview
- Also called: Dodge Grand Caravan (LWB Model); Dodge Caravan (SWB Model); Guangdong Sanxing SXZ6451 (Short wheelbase)/SXZ6490 (Long wheelbase) (China)
- Production: August 14, 1990 – August 1995
- Model years: 1991–1995
- Designer: Bob Hubbach (1987)

Body and chassis
- Body style: 3-door minivan
- Layout: Transverse front-engine, front-wheel drive / all-wheel drive
- Platform: Chrysler AS platform
- Related: Chrysler Town & Country; Plymouth Voyager; Chrysler Voyager (Europe only)

Powertrain
- Engine: 2.5 L EDM I4; 3.0 L Mitsubishi 6G72 V6; 3.3 L EGA V6; 3.8 L EGH V6
- Transmission: 5-speed A523 manual 3-speed A670; 3-speed A413 automatic 4-speed A604 automatic

Dimensions
- Wheelbase: 1991–1993 C/V: 112 in (2,845 mm); SWB & 1994–1995 C/V: 112.3 in (2,852 mm); 1991–1993 C/V Extended: 119.1 in (3,025 mm); C/V AWD: 112 in (2,845 mm); Grand Caravan & 1994–1995 C/V Extended: 119.3 in (3,030 mm)
- Length: 1991–1993 C/V: 175.9 in (4,468 mm); 1991–1993 SWB & 1994–95 C/V: 178.1 in (4,524 mm); 1991–1993 C/V Extended: 190.6 in (4,841 mm); Grand Caravan: 192.8 in (4,897 mm)
- Width: 72 in (1,828.8 mm); 1991 C/V: 72.2 in (1,834 mm); 1992–1993 C/V: 69.6 in (1,768 mm)
- Height: SWB & 1991–93 C/V: 64.2 in (1,631 mm); Grand Caravan: 64.8 in (1,646 mm); 1991–93 AWD: 65.9 in (1,674 mm); Grand Caravan: 66 in (1,676.4 mm); Grand Caravan: 66.7 in (1,694 mm); 1994–95 SE: 64.3 in (1,633 mm)
- Curb weight: 3,305 lb (1,499 kg); 3,531 lb (1,602 kg) (Grand Caravan)

For the 1991 model year, the second-generation Dodge Caravan was released. Intended as an extensive revision of the first generation, while the chassis underpinnings were carried over and updated, the only shared body panels were the front doors and the sliding door. To match the Ford Aerostar and General Motors APV minivans, designers sought to improve the exterior aerodynamics and the handling of the model line. To enhance safety, anti-lock brakes and all-wheel drive were introduced as options; as a first in the segment, a driver-side airbag became an option in 1991.

The model line again came in two lengths, with the long-wheelbase Grand Caravan making its return; the C/V cargo van also was part of the model line. The Caravan was further distinguished from the Voyager; along with different grilles and headlamp units, the Caravan received less chrome trim (limited to the grille and the Chrysler Pentastar hood ornament). Shedding its connection to the K-cars, the Caravan received a unique dashboard design (though shared with the Voyager, the Caravan received a new steering wheel design). On all but the base-trim Caravan, the seven-passenger trim was standard. In addition to the two rear bench seats, the second generation introduced the option of middle-row bucket seats; in 1992, Chrysler introduced integrated child safety seats, an innovation in the segment.

For the 1994 model year, the Caravan underwent a mid-cycle revision as part of a body upgrade to meet 1998 federal safety standards. Though the exterior saw only minor changes to the bumpers and lower body side trim, the interior underwent larger changes, receiving new seats and door panels. Coinciding with the addition of a passenger-side airbag, the dashboard was redesigned. Following its declining popularity, the woodgrain trim option was discontinued in favor of monochromatic and two-tone exterior designs.

To commemorate the tenth year of production, Dodge offered the "10th Anniversary Edition" option package for 1994. Available on SE/LE trims of the Caravan and Grand Caravan, the 10th Anniversary Edition was an appearance package, combining a two-tone exterior (a light-gray lower body with selected upper body colors) with a gold front fender badge.

=== Trim levels ===
- Base – Included: cloth-and-vinyl upholstery, intermediate bench seat, tinted manual windows, power mirrors, intermittent windshield wipers and a rear wiper, glove box, and an AM/FM stereo.
- SE – Added: power liftgate release, reclining front seats, and a rear bench seat.
- LE – Added: heated mirrors, forward storage console, tachometer, oil pressure, and voltage gauges, an overhead console, power locks, rear defroster, speed control, storage drawer under the front passenger seat, and a tilt steering column.

=== Engines ===
Except for the discontinued 150 hp 2.5 L turbocharged I4, the second-generation Caravan carried over its powertrain line from the 1990 Dodge Caravan. Shifting its powertrain commonality from the Dodge Aries to that of the larger Dodge Dynasty, a 2.5 L I4 was the standard engine, with a 3.0 L V6 and 3.3 L V6 as options. In 1994, the Caravan received a 3.8 L V6 (shared with the Chrysler Imperial/Fifth Avenue) as an option.

- 1991–1995 2.5 L EDM (K) I4, 100 hp (75 kW), 135 lb⋅ft (183 N⋅m)
- 1991–1995 3.0 L Mitsubishi 6G72 V6, 142 hp (106 kW), 173 lb⋅ft (235 N⋅m)
- 1991–1993 3.3 L EGA V6, 150 hp (110 kW), 185 lb⋅ft (251 N⋅m)
- 1994–1995 3.3 L EGA V6, 162 hp (121 kW), 194 lb⋅ft (263 N⋅m)
- 1994–1995 3.8 L EGH V6, 162 hp (121 kW), 213 lb⋅ft (289 N⋅m)

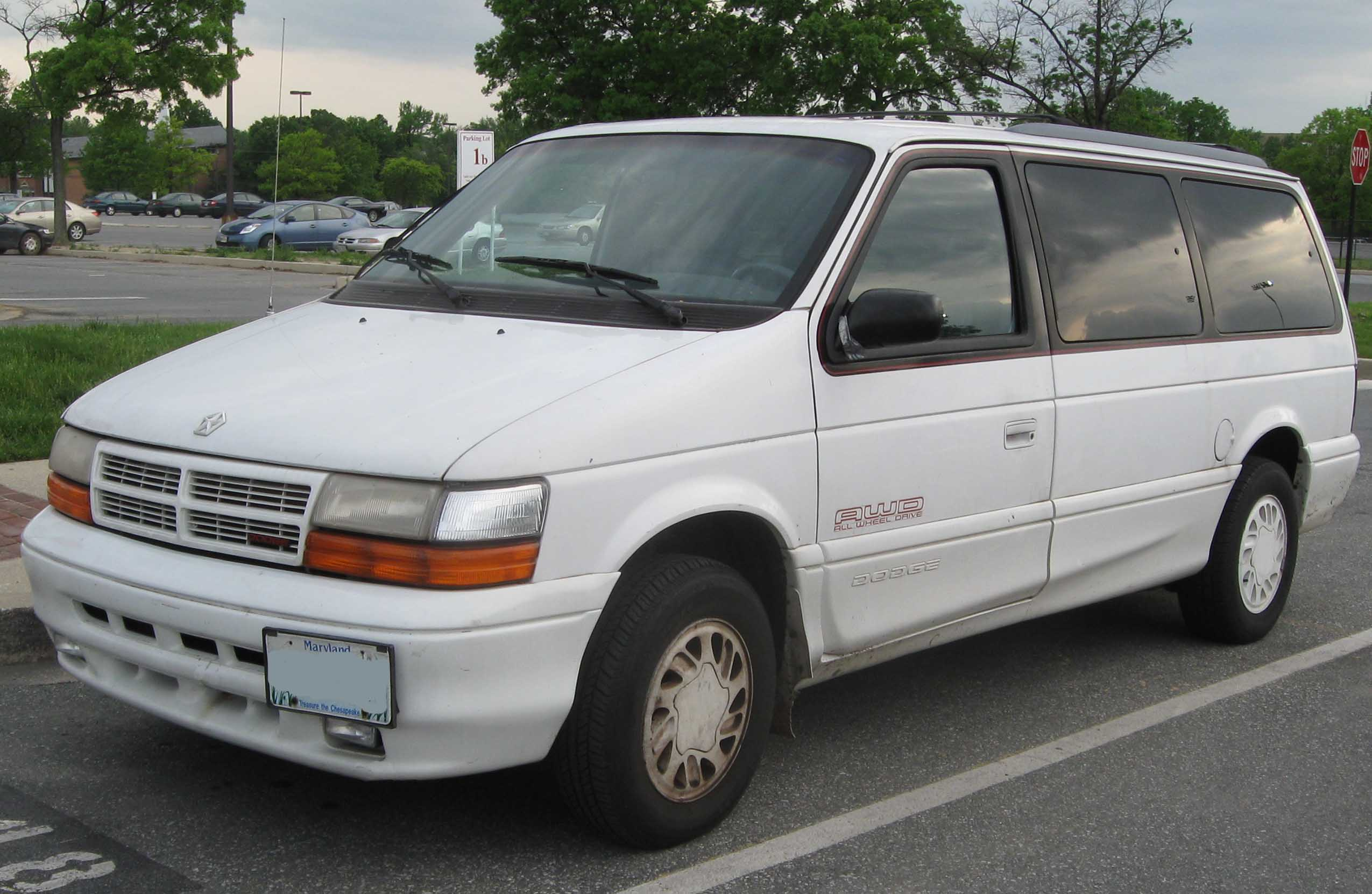
1994–1995 Dodge Grand Caravan ES AWD

=== Integrated child safety seats ===
In 1991, Dodge introduced a second-row bench seat integrating two child booster seats on 1992 models. These seats continued as an available option through Generation V until they were discontinued in 2010.

== Third generation (1996–2000) ==
Third generation
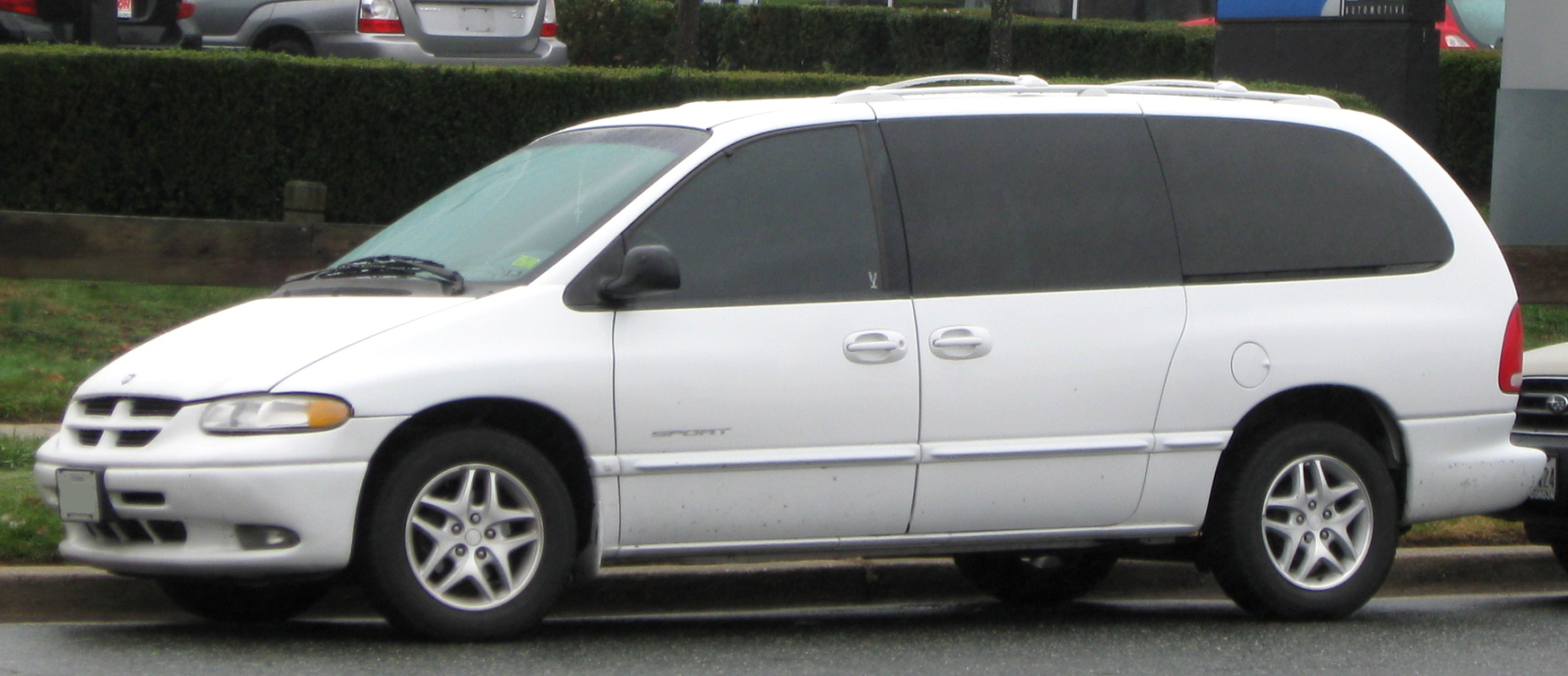
- Dodge Grand Caravan Sport

Overview
- Also called: Dodge Grand Caravan (LWB Model); Dodge Caravan (SWB Model); 3-Star Grand Caravan SXZ6510 (China)
- Production: January 30, 1995–2000
- Model years: 1996–2000; 1996–2002 (China)
- Assembly: St. Louis, Missouri, U.S. Windsor, Ontario, Canada
- Designer: Don Renkert (1991)

Body and chassis
- Body style: 3-door and 4-door minivan
- Layout: Transverse front-engine, front-wheel drive / all-wheel drive
- Platform: Chrysler NS platform
- Related: Chrysler Town & Country; Plymouth Voyager; Chrysler Voyager

Powertrain
- Engine: gasoline: 2.4 L EDZ I4; 3.0 L 6G72 V6; 3.3 L EGA V6 (also E85); 3.8 L EGH V6; 'diesel: 2.5 L VM425 turbo I4
- Transmission: 5-speed manual (diesel); 3-speed 31TH automatic 3-speed A670 automatic 4-speed 41TE automatic

Dimensions
- Wheelbase: SWB: 113.3 in (2,878 mm); Grand Caravan: 119.3 in (3,030 mm)
- Length: SWB: 186.3 in (4,732 mm); Grand Caravan FWD: 199.6 in (5,070 mm); Grand Caravan AWD: 199.7 in (5,072 mm)
- Width: 76.8 in (1,951 mm)
- Height: 68.5 in (1,740 mm); FWD: 68.7 in (1,745 mm)
- Curb weight: 3,528 lb (1,600 kg); 3,680 lb (1,669 kg) (Grand Caravan)

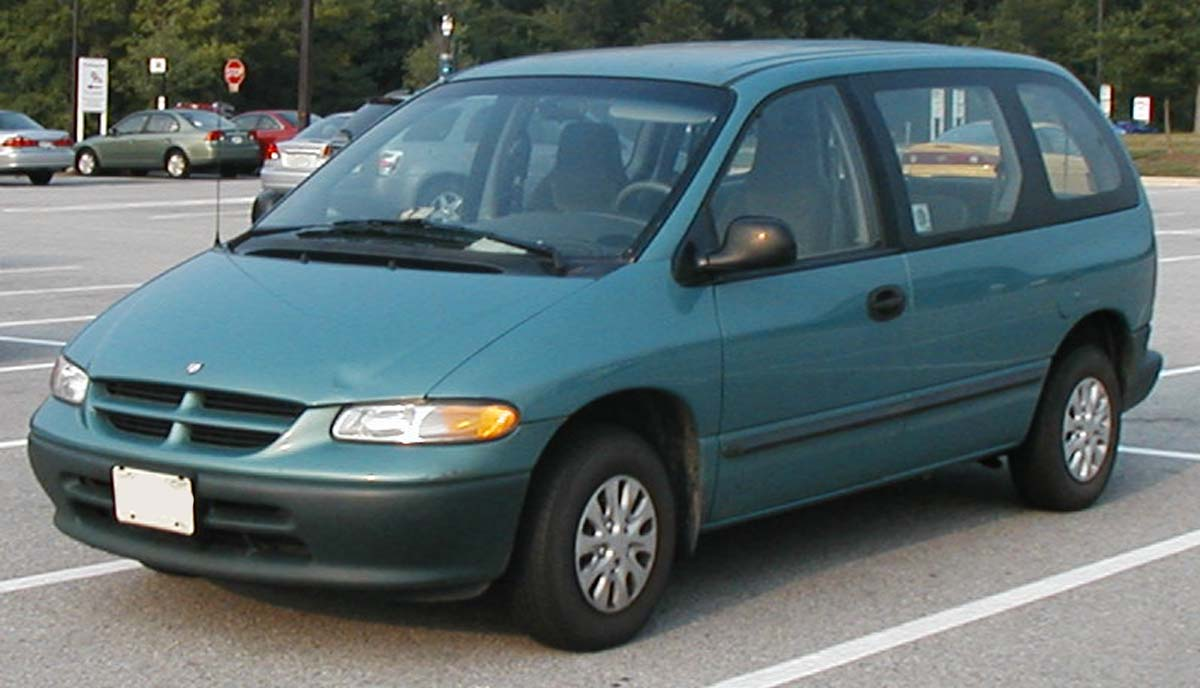
1996 Dodge Caravan (no driver-side sliding door)

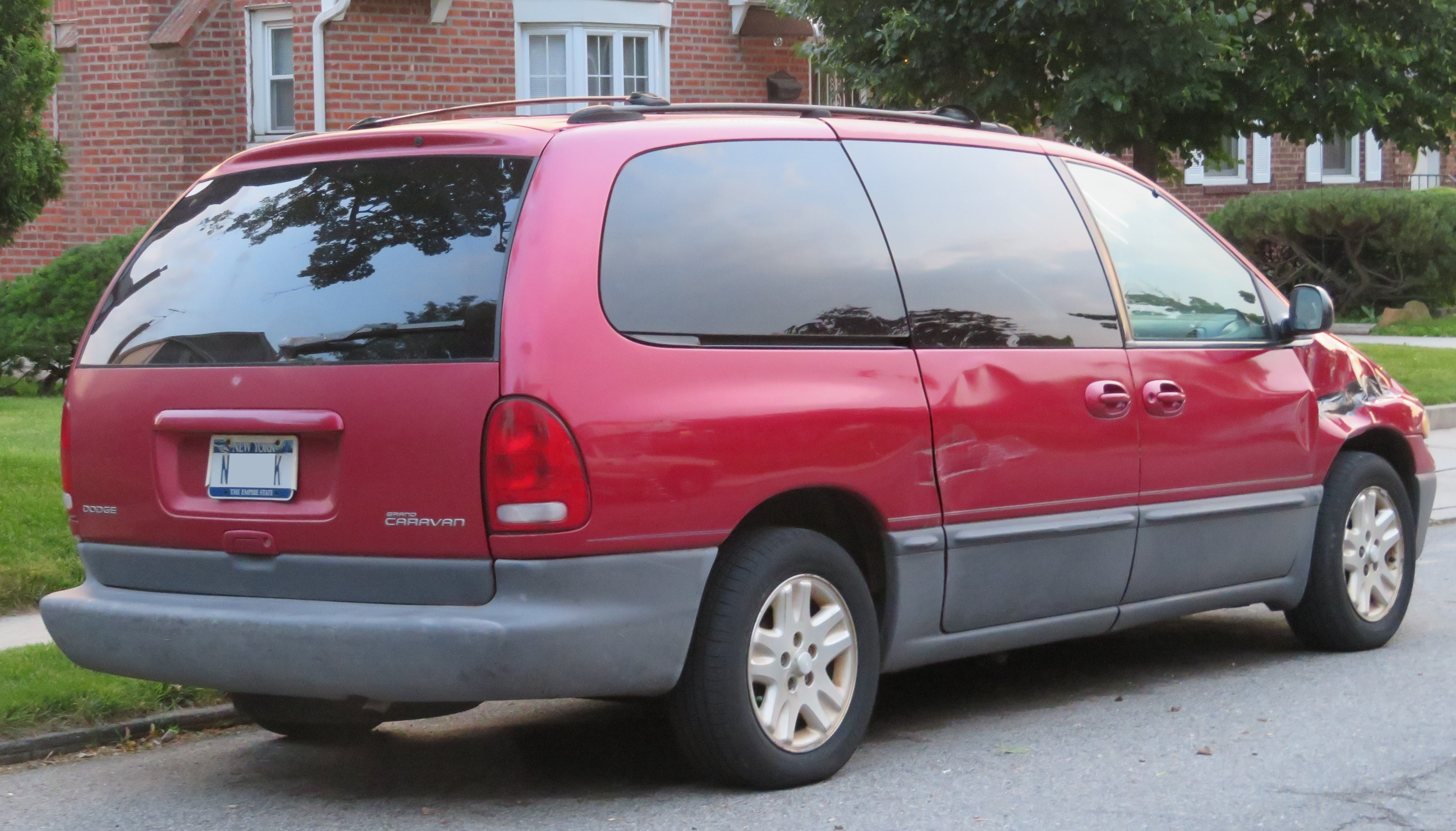
Dodge Grand Caravan LE rear view

The third-generation Chrysler minivans were available in long- and short–wheelbase models; three- and four-door configurations; and eight different powertrains, including electric and compressed natural gas; on a single, flexible platform.

In development for nearly five years from early 1990 (full development from 1991) to December 26, 1994 (final design by Don Renkert was approved on September 23, 1991, and frozen in May 1992), the 1996 model was introduced at the 1995 North American International Auto Show using the Chrysler S platform. It included a number of innovations, including a driver's side sliding door (optional initially, to become standard equipment later), a first for Chrysler and a non-compact minivan for the United States and Canada. With Generation III, Chrysler introduced a seat management system marketed as Easy Out Roller Seats. A conventional door handle and lock were added to the rear hatch, eliminating the confusing pop-and-lift maneuver that had been required on earlier models.

Base models of the Caravan were offered in most states with either a 2.4 L four-cylinder or the 3.0 L Mitsubishi 6G72 V6 engine, except in several northeastern states, where the Mitsubishi did not meet emissions standards. In those areas, the 3.3 L engine was offered as the V6 option from 1997 through 2000.

The 1996 Caravan, along with the Plymouth Voyager and the Chrysler Town & Country, won the North American Car of the Year award. The Caravan itself won Motor Trend magazine's Car of the Year 1996 and appeared on the Car and Driver Ten Best for 1996 and 1997. 1999 also saw the addition of a one-year-only 15th anniversary "Platinum Edition", to mark Caravan's 15th year of production. This package was offered on various trim levels and included Platinum Metallic paint as well as fender badges. The 2000 model year offered packages that included the "2000+" and "Millennium" packages; however, these were little more than unique fender badges on the vans with popular equipment.

During the 1996 model year, running changes saw the elimination of the plastic intake manifold cover from the 3.8L engine and redesigned interior door panels. Changes for the 1997 model year were minor, adding traction control as an option or standard equipment, depending on trim level, along with the reintroduction of optional all-wheel drive. The Caravan received more minor updates in 1997 for the 1998 model year. These changes came in the form of new colors, new wheels for trims above SE, new interior fabric, optional heated seats, and automatic headlights on higher trim levels. In the calendar year 1998, the Caravan's HVAC vents on the driver's side and center of the dashboard were updated to have a more conventional design. Later that year, the 1999 Caravan received new front styling on all trims above SE, while the Sport and ES models received even sportier styling. The ES model was the first minivan to receive the "AutoStick" transmission and 17-inch wheels. A cargo net between the driver and front passenger seats was added. Color-keyed door and lift-gate handles were made standard on SE models, in addition to a new keyless entry remote. Base and SE models had options for a spoiler as well as color-keyed bumpers and trim (grey or color-molded bumpers and trim were standard). The driver's side sliding door became standard. Chrysler had updates of the Plymouth Voyager in 1996 for the 1997 model year and the Chrysler Town & Country in 1997 for the 1998 model year, before the 1998–2007 DaimlerChrysler era; it was the only exterior update of the NS Dodge Caravan.

=== Trim levels ===
- Base – Included: Cloth upholstery, speed-sensitive wipers, manual locks, 14-inch steel road wheels with "Successor" hubcaps, and an AM/FM stereo with four speakers. Package 22T added air conditioning and a cargo net.
- SE – Added: air conditioning, power mirrors, speed control, rear defroster, power locks, sliding rear driver's side door, an AM/FM stereo with cassette player and four speakers, steering wheel audio controls, and 15-inch steel road wheels with "revolver" hubcaps. Package 28D added power front windows with automatic driver's side window, ignition delay, glove box, and an ashtray.
- Sport – Added: tinted windows, and power windows with automatic driver's side window, fog lamps, and 16-inch steel road wheels with "Vortex" hubcaps.
- LE – Added: optional leather seating surfaces, dual-zone air conditioning with temp control, overhead console with sunglass holder, garage door opener holder, illuminated entry, headlamp off delay, keyless entry, security alarm, power driver's seat, an AM/FM stereo with cassette player, steering wheel audio controls, graphic equalizer, Infinity 200-watt sound system and 10 speakers, center console storage bin, and 15-inch steel road wheels with "Citadel" hubcaps.
- ES – Added: leather seating surfaces, fog lamps, automatic headlamps, garage door opener, heated power front seats, an AM/FM stereo with cassette and CD players, rear spoiler, and 16-inch "genesis" alloy road wheels.

=== Engines ===
- 1996–2000 2.4 L EDZ I4, 150 hp (110 kW), 167 lb⋅ft (226 N⋅m) (Canadian vans beginning in 1999 included a 3.0 L V6 as standard equipment)
- 1996–2000 3.0 L Mitsubishi 6G72 V6 150 hp (110 kW), 176 lb⋅ft (239 N⋅m) (not available in certain U.S. states, 3.3 L V6 offered as standard equipment in those states instead)
- 1996–2000 3.3 L EGA V6, 158 hp (118 kW), 203 lb⋅ft (275 N⋅m)
- 1996–1997 3.8 L EGH V6, 166 hp (124 kW), 227 lb⋅ft (308 N⋅m)
- 1998–2000 3.8 L EGH V6, 180 hp (130 kW), 240 lb⋅ft (330 N⋅m)

=== Dodge Caravan EPIC ===
In 1999, Dodge introduced the Caravan EPIC, a fully electric minivan. The EPIC was powered by 28 12-volt NiMH batteries and was capable of traveling up to 80 miles (130 km) on a single charge. The EPIC was a fleet-only lease vehicle. Production of the EPIC was discontinued in 2001. Only a few hundred of these vehicles were produced. After the leases expired they were returned and crushed. Approximately ten vans remain in private hands today.

=== Crash test results ===
The 1996–2000 Dodge Grand Caravan received a "Marginal" rating in the Insurance Institute for Highway Safety's 40 mph offset test. The structural performance and restraints were graded "Acceptable", but the foot injuries were very high.

In the NHTSA crash tests, it received four stars for the driver and front passenger in the frontal impact. In the side-impact test, it received five stars for the driver, and three stars for the rear occupant, and resulted in a fuel leak that could cause a fire hazard.

=== Concepts ===
Other plans for this generation included three minivan concepts to be made in the Windsor Assembly: the Dodge Caravan R/T, Voyager XG, and the Chrysler Pacifica 1999 concept. The Caravan R/T (originally ESS) was to include the most powerful engine ever for a minivan, rated at 325 horsepower (242 kW). It had large air intakes and driving lights in the front bumper, a brushed aluminum instrument panel, racing-style pedals, and black and white rubber flooring. The Voyager XG was more rugged, featured a diesel engine and manual transmission, and included many outdoor amenities, such as a built-in ice pack. The Chrysler Pacifica, based on the Town & Country, was more luxurious, had power leather seats and footrests, overhead bins, lighting, an LHS grille, and roof-long skylights. The Pacifica nameplate was introduced on a production crossover SUV in 2004; this model would be retired in 2008, and the nameplate would return on a minivan in 2016.

=== Easy-Out Roller Seats ===
In 1995, Dodge introduced a system of seats to simplify installation, removal, and re-positioning, marketed as Easy-Out Roller Seats. When installed, the seats are latched to floor-mounted strikers. When unlatched, eight rollers lift each seat, allowing it to be rolled fore and aft. Tracks have locator depressions for rollers, to simplify installation. Ergonomic levers at the seatbacks release the floor latches single-handedly, without tools, and raise the seats onto the rollers in a single motion. Additionally, seatbacks were designed to fold forward. Seat roller tracks are permanently attached to the floor and seat stanchions are aligned, facilitating the longitudinal rolling of the seats. Bench seat stanchions were moved inboard to reduce bending stress in the seat frames, allowing them to be lighter.

When configured as two and three-person benches (available through Generation IV), the Easy Out Roller Seats could be unwieldy. Beginning in 2000, second and third-row seats became available in a 'quad' configuration – bucket or captain chairs in the second row and a third-row three-person 50/50 split "bench" – with each section weighing under 50 lb (23 kg). The Easy-out system remained in use through Generation V – where certain models featured a two-person bench and the under-floor compartments from the Stow'n Go system.

== Fourth generation (2001–2007) ==
Fourth generation
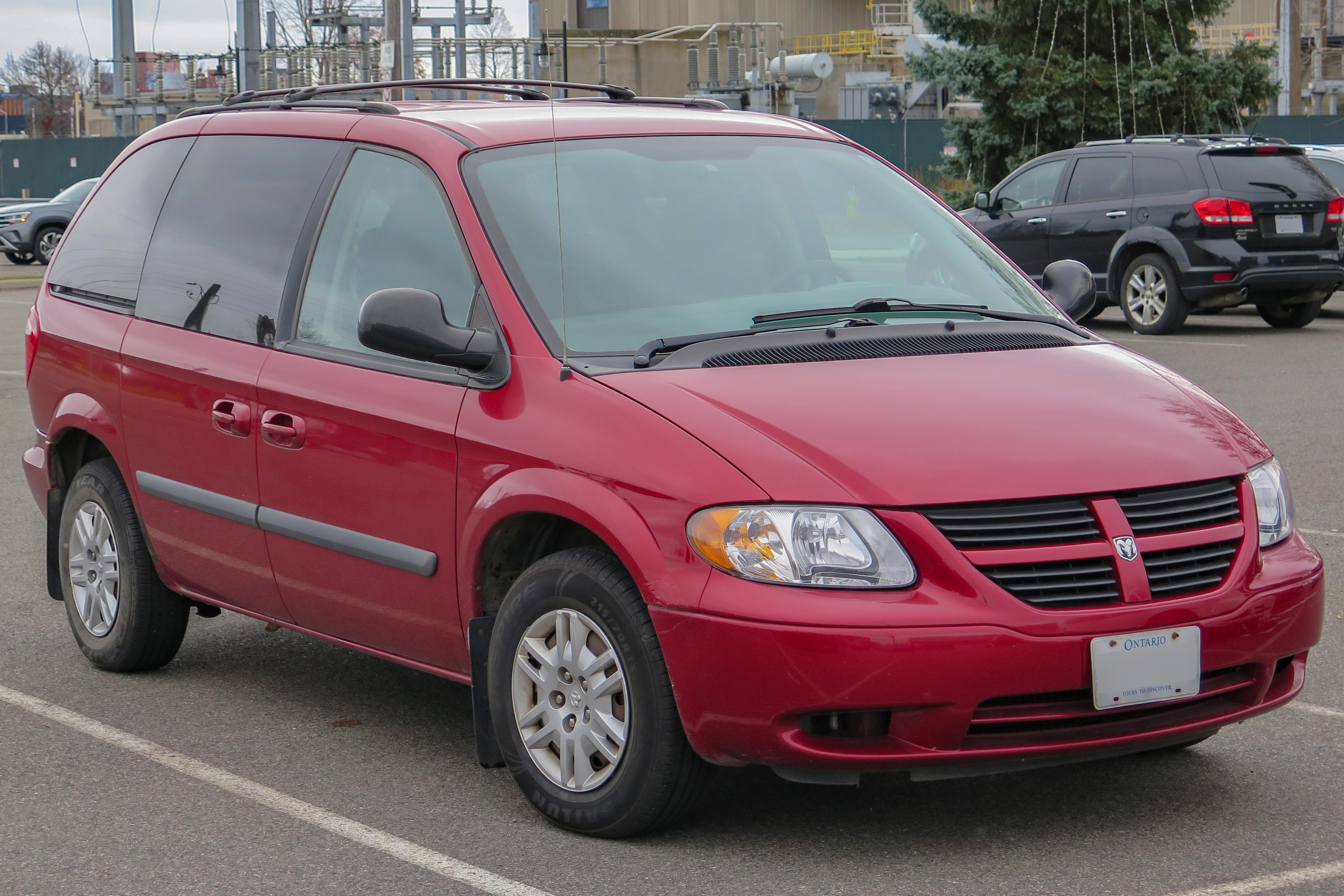
- 2007 Dodge Caravan Base (post-facelift)

Overview
- Also called: Dodge Grand Caravan (LWB Model); Dodge Caravan (SWB Model)
- Production: July 24, 2000 – July 2007 (North America); 2007–2011 (China)
- Model years: 2001–2007 (North America); 2008–2012 (China)
- Designer: Brandon Faurote (1997)

Body and chassis
- Body style: 4-door minivan
- Layout: Transverse front-engine, front-wheel drive / all-wheel drive
- Platform: Chrysler RS platform
- Related: Chrysler Town & Country; Chrysler Pacifica; Chrysler Voyager

Powertrain
- Engine: 2.4 L EDZ I4; 2.8 L CRD diesel (Philippines); 3.0 L 6G72 V6 (China); 3.3 L EGA V6; 3.8 L EGH V6
- Transmission: 3-speed 31TH automatic with 2.4EDZ; 4-speed 41TE automatic

Dimensions
- Wheelbase: SWB: 113.3 in (2,878 mm); Grand Caravan: 119.3 in (3,030 mm)
- Length: 2001–2004 SWB: 189.1 in (4,803 mm); 2005–2007 SWB: 189.3 in (4,808 mm); Grand Caravan: 200.5 in (5,093 mm)/200.6 in (5,095 mm)
- Width: 78.6 in (1,996 mm)
- Height: 68.9 in (1,750 mm)
- Curb weight: 3,862 lb (1,751 kg) 3,999 lb (1,813 kg) (Grand Caravan)

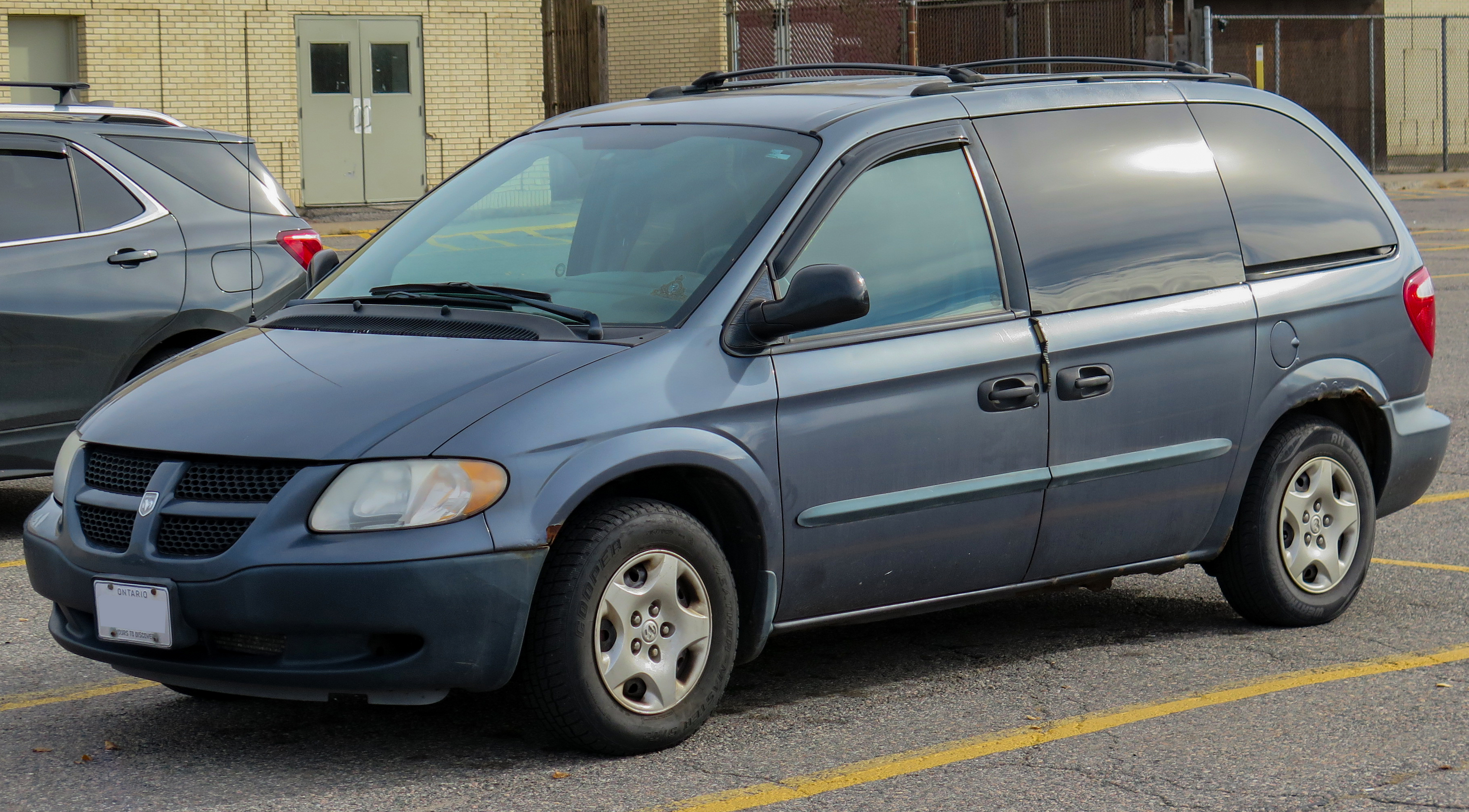
Pre-facelift styling

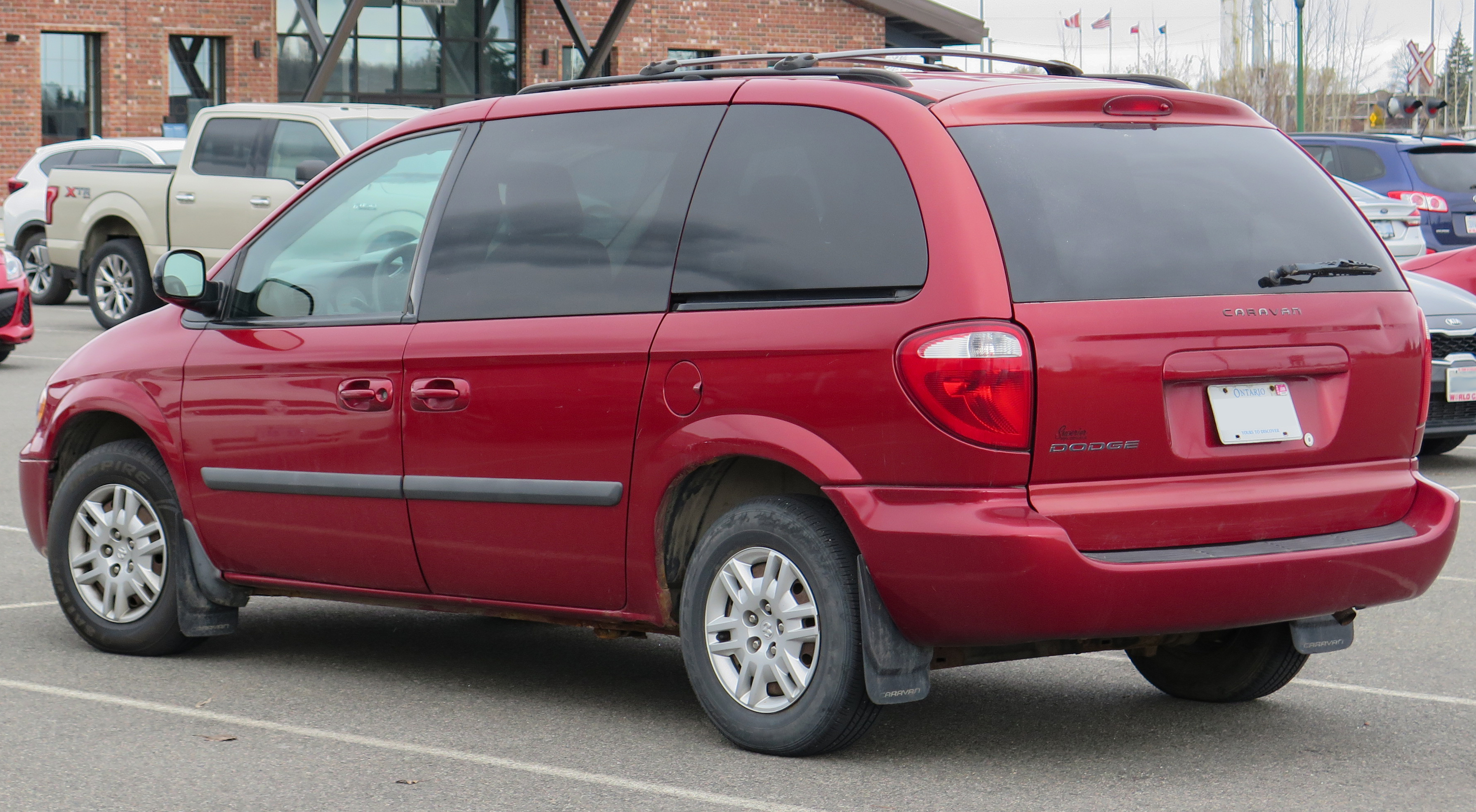
Rear view

Unveiled at the North American International Auto Show (NAIAS) on January 10, 2000, the redesigned 2001 Dodge Caravan and 2001 Chrysler Town & Country were released in August 2000. The release was part of a promotional tie-in with Nabisco, who unveiled their new "Mini Oreos" inside the van during the unveiling. The first vans rolled off the line at the Windsor Assembly Plant on July 24, 2000. The fourth generation vans were available in the trim levels; SE, Sport, SXT, AWD Sports, "base" model, AWD Choice, eL, C/V, ES, EX, AWD Wagon, and SXT All-Wheel-Drive.

In development from February 1996 to December 1999, the Generation IV minivans were based on the Chrysler RS platform and featured a larger body frame with modified headlights and taillights. Design work was done by Brandon Faurote in January 1997, and reached production approval in 1998.

In addition to other detailed changes, power sliding doors and a power hatch became available as options. The Mitsubishi 3.0 L V6, which no longer met emissions standards in California and the northeastern U.S., was discontinued, and a more powerful 3.8 L engine, based on the 3.3 L, became available. All-wheel drive continued to be offered on high-end models. Other innovative available features included remote-operated sliding doors and a rear hatch, which could be opened and closed at the push of a button, either inside the vehicle or with the keyless entry fob.

For the 2002 model year, DaimlerChrysler stopped using the Dodge badges on the front doors, as with all Dodge vehicles.

In 2003, the Caravan C/V and Grand Caravan C/V returned after having been discontinued in 1995. The C/V featured the option of deleted side windows (replaced by composite panels), optional rear seats, a cargo floor made of plastic material similar to pickup truck bed liners, rubber flooring in place of carpeting, and a normal hatch at the rear. Minor changes were made to the Grand Caravan ES including many of the features included in Option Group 29S becoming standard, the 17-inch Titan chrome wheels no longer being an option replaced with standard 16-inch chrome wheels, and the disappearance of the AutoStick Transmission option. This year also saw the appearance of an optional factory-installed rear-seat DVD system with a single-disc player mounted below the HVAC controls.

The 2004 model year offered an exclusive one-year-only "Anniversary Edition" package to mark Caravan's 20th year in production. This package was offered on higher-level SXT models and included chrome wheels, body-color moldings, special interior accents, as well as a unique fender badge.

The 2005 model year came very early, starting production in January 2004. Changes for 2005 included a revised grille, new foglight fascia, and a system of in-floor folding second and third-row seats, marketed as Stow 'n Go seating.

Production of this generation continued in China from 2008, when the Taiwanese Chrysler Town & Country production line was relocated there, until late 2010, when the fifth-generation Chrysler Voyager was introduced to the Chinese market. The Caravan was subsequently replaced by the Dodge Journey, although a page for the Caravan still exists on the Dodge China site. The Chinese Caravan was produced alongside the Town & Country, now using the Grand Voyager nameplate, by Soueast, and did not share any aesthetic components with the North American Caravan aside from the wheels. Instead, the Chinese Caravan was identical to the Taiwanese Town & Country, aside from the lack of chrome trim on the exterior door panels, and used a modified version of the Town & Country front bumper with a Dodge grille. Chinese vans were equipped with Mitsubishi 6G72 engines and came in three trim levels: Classic, SXT, and Luxury.

=== Trim levels ===
- SE – Included: Cloth upholstery, grocery bag hooks, manual air conditioning, tinted windows, manual locks, an AM/FM stereo with cassette player and four speakers (later, a single-CD player replaced the tape deck), and 15" steel road wheels with "Kinetic" hubcaps. Later standard features were sliding door alert (hazards flash when opening), and 15-nch steel road wheels with "Interface" hubcaps.
- SE Plus (Grand Caravan only) – Added: power mirrors, sound insulation, keyless entry, illuminated entry, power front windows, and rear vents,
- Sport – Added: an overhead console, rear defroster, sunscreen glass, speed control, power locks, floor mats, tachometer, power heated mirrors, an AM/FM stereo with cassette player and 6 speakers, power windows, and 15-inch "crossfire" hubcaps. Package 25H added dual-zone air conditioning, glove box and ashtray lights, and headlamp off delay. Package 25K added an AM/FM stereo with single CD and cassette players and 6 speakers, power sliding doors, and a power driver's seat. Later replaced by the SXT package.
- SXT – Added (from SE Plus): Three-zone air conditioning, power driver's seat, fog lamps, power sliding doors, HomeLink garage door opener, an AM/FM stereo with single-CD/cassette players and 6 speakers, tachometer, and 16-inch "Ingot" alloy road wheels.
- ES – Added: three-zone air conditioning, a trip computer, fog lamps, driver's side power sliding door, garage door opener, an AM/FM stereo with cassette player, in-dash 4-disc CD changer with Infinity sound system, and 16-inch "Europa" alloy road wheels.

=== Engines ===
- 2001–2007 2.4 L EDZ I4, 150 hp (110 kW) at 5400 rpm and 165 lb⋅ft (224 N⋅m) at 4000 rpm
- 2001–2007 3.3 L EGA V6, 180 hp (130 kW) at 5000 rpm and 210 lb⋅ft (280 N⋅m) at 4000 rpm
- 2001–2007 3.8 L EGH V6, 200 hp (150 kW) at 5000 rpm and 245 lb⋅ft (332 N⋅m) at 4000 rpm

=== IIHS results ===
The 2001 model of this version earned a "Poor" rating in the Insurance Institute for Highway Safety's 40 mph offset test. It did protect its occupants reasonably well, and the dummy movement was well controlled; however, a fuel leak occurred. Chrysler corrected this problem starting with the 2002 models, moving it up to an "Acceptable" rating.

The 2006 model year brought optional side curtain airbags and a stronger B-pillar, which was tested by the Insurance Institute for Highway Safety's side-impact crash test. With the side airbags, it got an "Acceptable" rating. For the driver, there is a chance of serious neck injuries, rib fractures, and/or internal organ injuries. The rear passengers, however, could leave this accident unharmed, as there is a low risk of significant injury in a crash of this severity for them.

=== Stow 'N Go seating ===
In 2004, Dodge introduced a system of second- and third-row seating that folded completely into under-floor compartments. It was marketed as Stow 'N Go and was available exclusively on long-wheelbase models.

In a development program costing $400 million, engineers initially used an Erector Set to visualize the complex interaction of the design and redesigned under-floor components. The system included the spare tire well, fuel tank, exhaust system, parking brake cables, rear climate control lines, and rear suspension but precluded all-wheel drive (AWD).

The system, in turn, creates a combined volume of 12 cubic feet (340 L) of under-floor storage when second-row seats are deployed. With both rows folded, the vans have a flat-load floor and a maximum cargo volume of 160.7 cubic feet (4,550 L).

The Stow 'n Go system received the Popular Science magazine's "Best of What's New" for 2005 award, but was never offered on the Volkswagen Routan, the rebadged nameplate variant of the Chrysler minivans.

For the 2011 model year, Chrysler revised the system, rebranding it as "Super Stow 'n Go". New pivoting head restraints with taller seatbacks and a revised folding mechanism (marketed as "single action") improved stowage ease – with the head restraints folding on themselves automatically and the entire seat automatically folding down to a position just over its floor recess.

== Fifth generation (2008–2020) ==
Fifth generation (Dodge Grand Caravan)
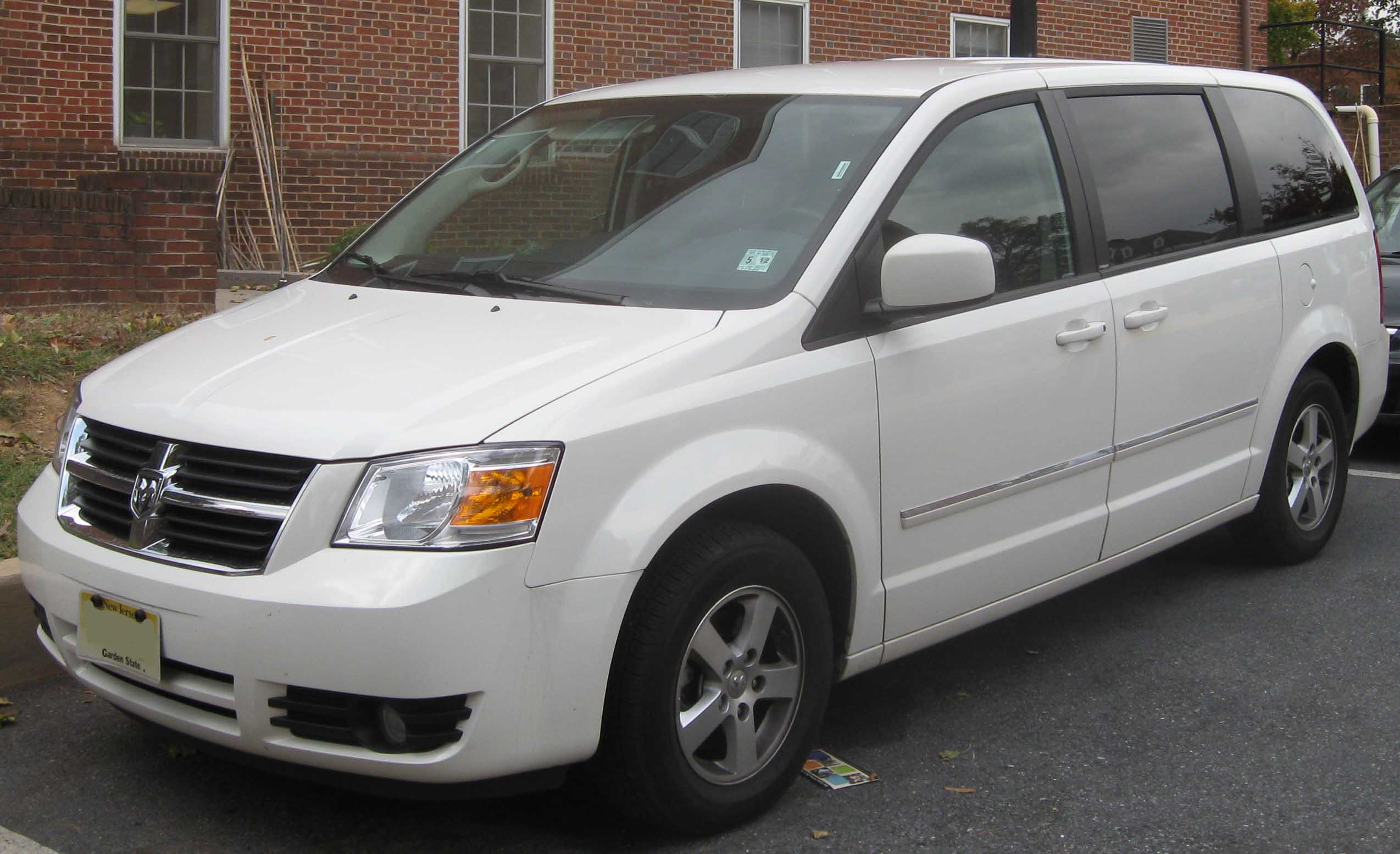
- 2008 Dodge Grand Caravan SXT

Overview
- Also called: Ram C/V Tradesman
- Production: August 16, 2007 – August 21, 2020
- Model years: 2008–2020
- Designer: Ralph Gilles (2006)

Body and chassis
- Body style: 4-door minivan
- Layout: Transverse front-engine, front-wheel drive
- Platform: Chrysler RT platform
- Related: Chrysler Town & Country; Chrysler Grand Voyager; Volkswagen Routan

Powertrain
- Engine: 2.8 L 176 hp (131 kW) CRD I4 diesel 3.3 L 175 hp (130 kW) V6; 3.8 L 197 hp (147 kW) V6; 4.0 L 251 hp (187 kW) V6; 3.6 L 283 hp (211 kW) Pentastar V6
- Transmission: 4-speed automatic (3.3 engine); 62TE 6-speed automatic (3.6, 3.8, 4.0 engines)

Dimensions
- Wheelbase: 121.2 in (3,078 mm)
- Length: 202.5 in (5,144 mm); Ram Cargo Van: 202.8 in (5,151 mm)
- Width: 78.7 in (1,999 mm)
- Height: 69.0 in (1,753 mm)
- Curb weight: 4,306 lb (1,953 kg)

The fifth-generation Dodge minivan debuted at the 2007 North American International Auto Show, with exterior styling by Ralph Gilles. Starting with the 2008 model year, Chrysler only made the long-wheelbase Grand Caravan. With the discontinuation of the short-wheelbase Caravan, Dodge offered the Journey on nearly an identical wheelbase and as a crossover rather than a minivan. Although the SWB model, which had accounted for half of all sales in Canada, cost approximately $2,000 less and offered a four-cylinder engine option with improved fuel economy, Chrysler executives stated the SWB Caravan was discontinued to accommodate new features offered in the Grand Caravan, consistent with the demands of the majority of the minivan market.

A new six-speed automatic transmission became standard with the 3.8 L V6 and the new 4.0 L V6. The four-speed automatic transmission is standard with the 3.3 L Flex-Fuel V6. This generation of Grand Caravan and its Town & Country counterpart were not available with an all-wheel-drive system. The previously unavailable Electronic Stability Control was made standard on this generation.

Chrysler introduced a seat management system marketed as Swivel 'n Go seating, the MyGIG entertainment system (a stereo with a built-in hard drive for recording, storing, and playing music), second- and third-row video screens, powered second-row windows, standard side curtain airbags, and dashboard-mounted transmission controls. The gear shift lever moved to the instrument panel, the location used by competitors.

The market shifted briefly away from minivans and SUVs with the gasoline price spikes of the earlier part of 2008. This trend began to reverse itself in the fall of 2008. The Dodge Grand Caravan continued to be the top-selling minivan in Canada during 2009 and 2010, with over 60% of the market's monthly sales.

Automotive News reported that Dodge sold about a third of its 2010 Grand Caravans to rental fleets from January to October 2010. The relatively high rental fleet sales depressed used vehicles' resale value; as the number of returned ex-rental 2010 Grand Caravan to the market jumped fourfold between July and October, prices of used 2009 and 2010 Dodge minivans dropped by as much as 20%.

In 2014, Chrysler recalled 2010-14 model year Grand Caravans with power third-row windows to fix faulty window switches that could lead to fire.

The Dodge Grand Caravan was discontinued after the 2020 model year because of "regulatory reasons". It was reported that the cost of updating the vehicle to meet new federal safety regulations is so high that it would eliminate its low price advantage.

=== Trim levels ===
- SE – Included: Cloth upholstery, 16-inch steel wheels with hubcaps, overhead console with observation mirror, sunglass bin (not available if equipped with sunroof), power locks, power windows with automatic driver's side window, sliding door alert system (hazards flash for 10 seconds when opened), manual sliding doors, manual mirrors, air conditioning (manual temperature control), floor console, and an AM/FM stereo with a single-CD player, MP3 capability, auxiliary input jack and four speakers.
- SXT Added: power sliding doors, power heated mirrors, automatic front windows, power second-row windows, rear power vents, a rear overhead console, universal garage door opener, LED lighting with rear overhead swivel lamps, leather-wrapped steering wheel with audio controls, power driver's seat, Stow N Go, an AM/FM stereo with single-CD/DVD player with MP3 capability, 20 GB HDD, backup camera and 6 speakers, and 16-inch alloy road wheels.
- SXT Premium Added: Chromed exterior mirrors and chrome-striped side molding, 17-inch alloy road wheels, power sunroof

=== Engines ===
Model	Displacement	Type	Valves	Power (HP@RPM)	Torque (lb-ft@RPM)	Compression ratio	Transmission	Fuel economy (MPG)	Years
2.8L VM Motori A 428 DOHC diesel I4	2,766 cc (168.8 cu in)	DOHC	16	161@3,600	266@2,000		6-speed 62TE automatic		2011–
2.8L VM Motori RA 428 DOHC diesel I4	2,766 cc (168.8 cu in)	DOHC	16	161@3,600	310@2,000		6-speed 62TE automatic		2008–2010
3.3 L V6	3,301 cc (201.4 cu in)	OHV	12	175@5,000	205@4,000	9.3:1	4-speed 41TE automatic	17/24	2008–2010
Pentastar 3.6 L V6	3,604 cc (219.9 cu in)	DOHC	24	283@6,400	260@4,400	10.0:1	6-speed 62TE automatic	17/25	2011–2020
3.8 L V6	3,778 cc (230.5 cu in)	OHV	12	197@5,200	230@4,000	9.6:1	6-speed 62TE automatic	16/23	2008–2010
4.0 L V6	3,952 cc (241.2 cu in)	SOHC	24	251@6,000	259@4,100	10.2:1	6-speed 62TE automatic	17/25	2008–2010

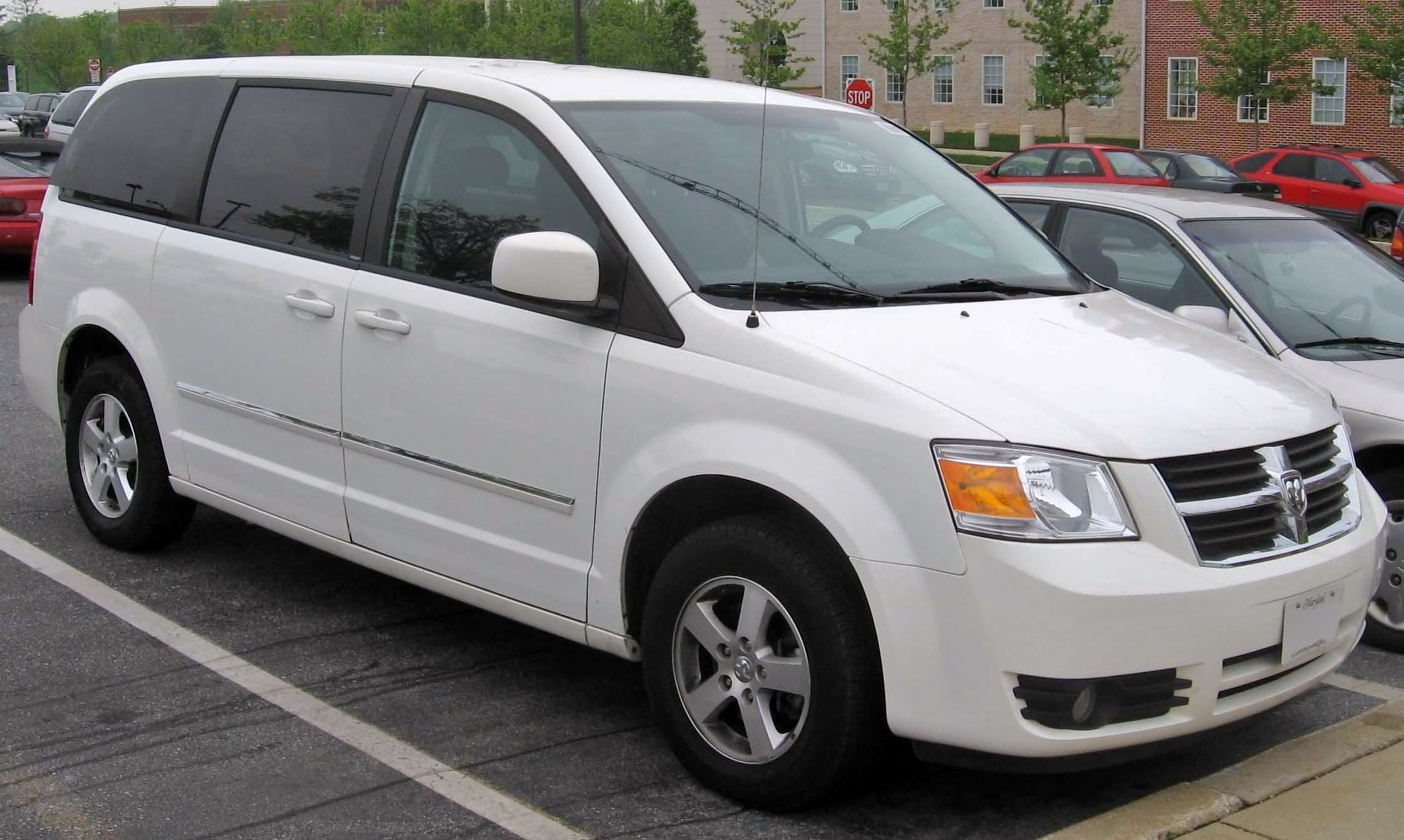
2008–2010 Dodge Grand Caravan SXT

Both the 3.8 L and 4.0 L engines were paired with Chrysler's 62TE six-speed automatic transmission with variable line pressure (VLP) technology (See Ultradrive#62TE).

In Canada (2008–2010), the 3.3 L was the standard engine across the range, combined with the four-speed 41TE automatic transmission. The 4.0 L engine and the six-speed combination was available as an option on only the top-of-the-range SXT models. In 2011, the six-speed transmission was specified as standard on the Town & Country.

=== Swivel 'n Go seating ===
Dodge introduced a seating system for 2008, marketed as Swivel 'n Go. In the seating system, two full-size second-row seats swivel to face the third row. A detachable table can be placed between the second and third-row seats. The Swivel 'n Go seating system includes the third-row seating from the Stow 'n Go system. The system was offered on the Dodge Grand Caravan and Chrysler Town & Country, but not the Volkswagen Routan, a rebadged nameplate variant of the Chrysler minivans.

These Swivel 'n Go Seats were manufactured by Intier, a division of Magna International. The tracks, risers, and swivel mechanisms were assembled by Camslide, a division of Intier. The swivel mechanism was designed and produced by Toyo Seat. The swivel mechanism includes bumpers that stabilize the seat while in the lock position. When rotated, the seat comes off these bumpers to allow easy rotation. The seat is not meant to be left in an unlocked position or swiveled with the occupant in it, although this will not damage the swivel mechanism.

The Swivel 'n Go feature was discontinued after the 2010 model year.

=== Model history ===
==== 2009 model year ====
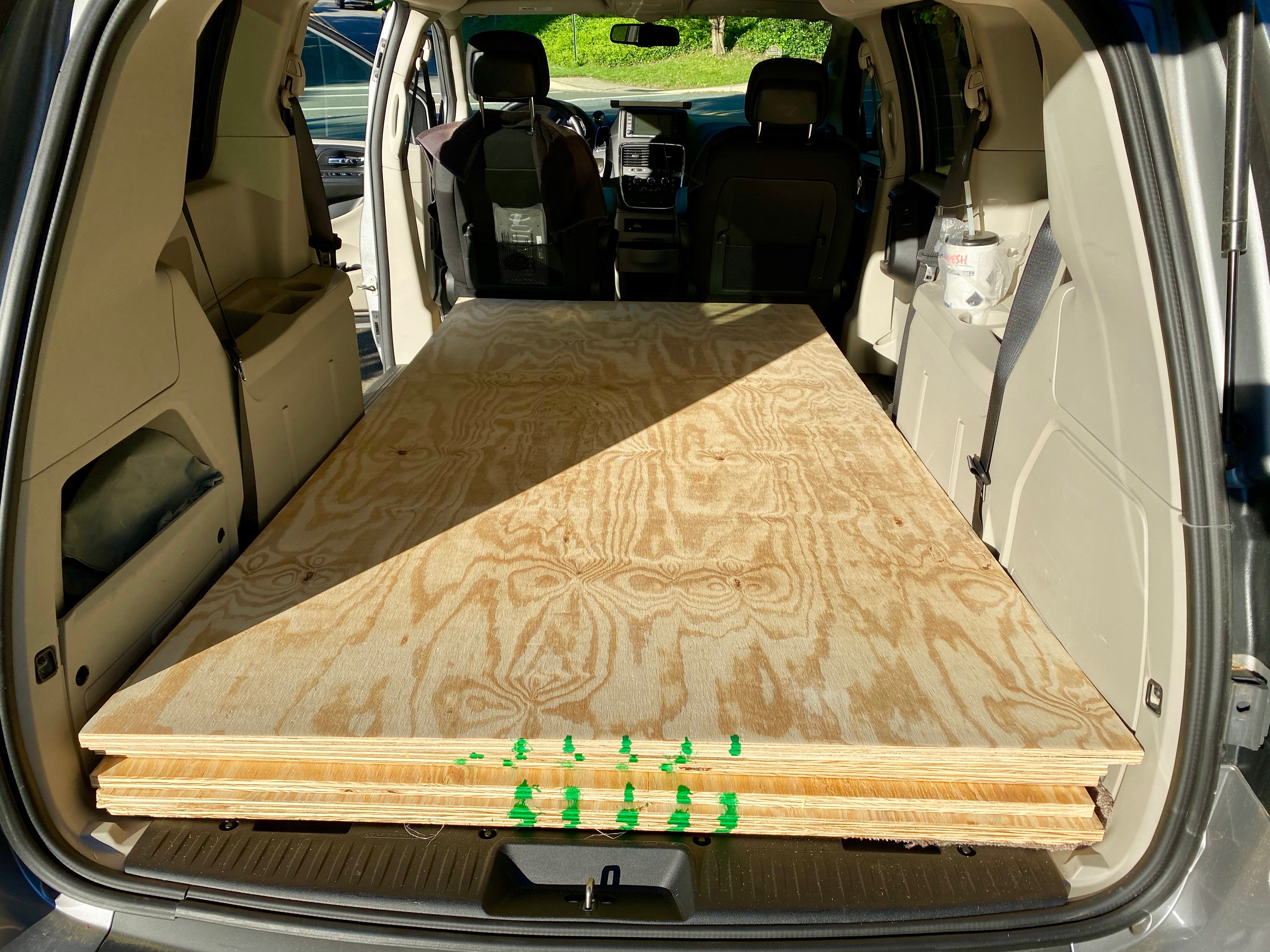
Cargo area with 4x8 foot plywood sheets

For 2009, standard Stow 'n Go seats were added that folded flat into the rear area floor to create more cargo room, while the Swivel 'n Go seats turned 180 degrees to face the third row. The available SXT trim now included new technology options. New for 2009 was an optional "sport" suspension system, as well as a blind-spot warning system and "Cross Path Detection" with sensors to warn of cars or other obstacles when backing out of a parking space.

==== 2010 model year ====
The Chrysler minivans became the only domestic brand minivans after General Motors and Ford replaced their slow-selling models with three-row crossover SUVs.

Changes for the 2010 Dodge Grand Caravans included new active head restraints for the driver and front passenger on all models, three-zone manual climate controls for the Grand Caravan SE, and a new 3.16 final drive ratio for models equipped with the 4.0-liter engine.

==== 2011 model year ====
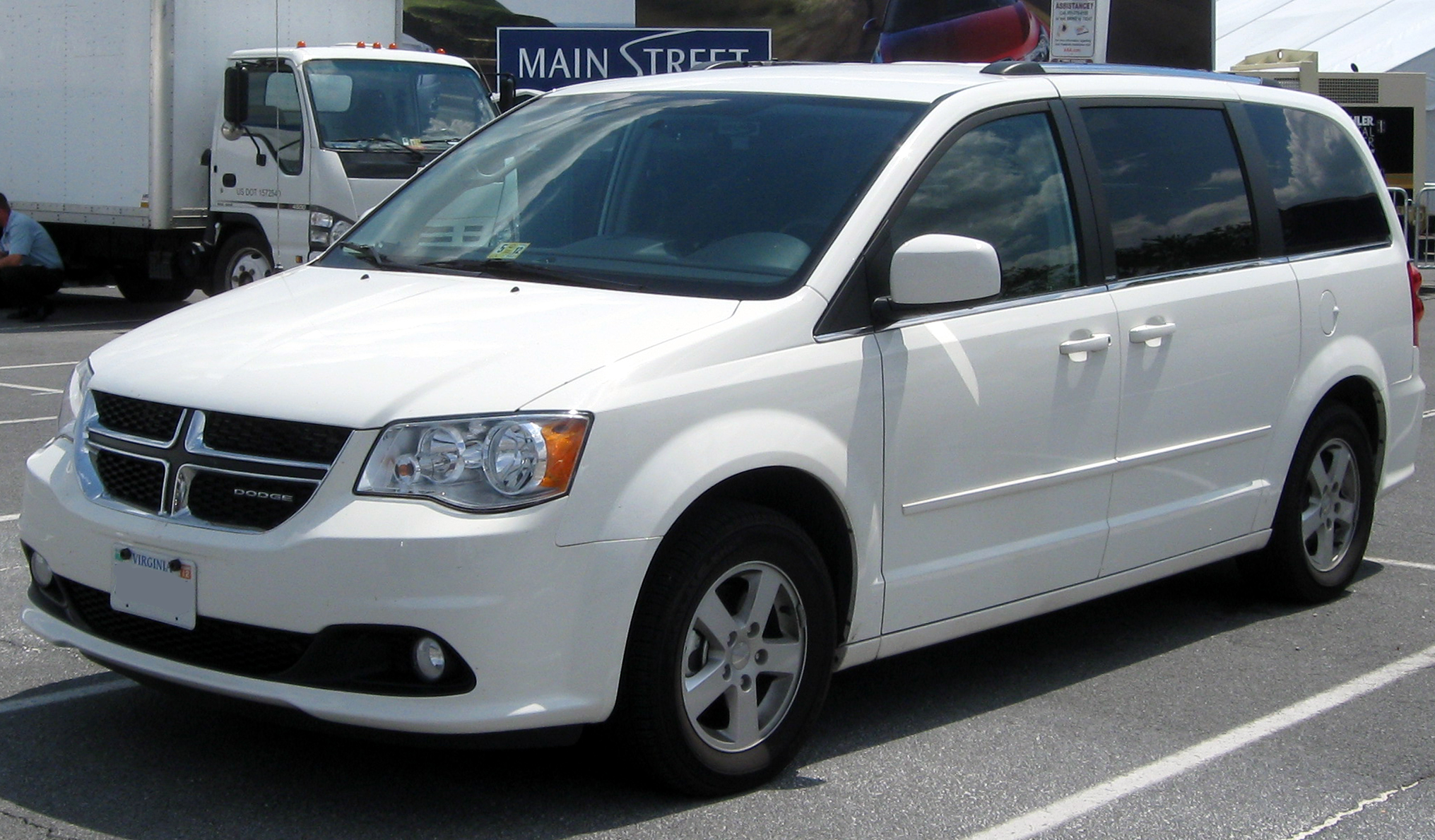
Post-facelift 2011 Dodge Grand Caravan

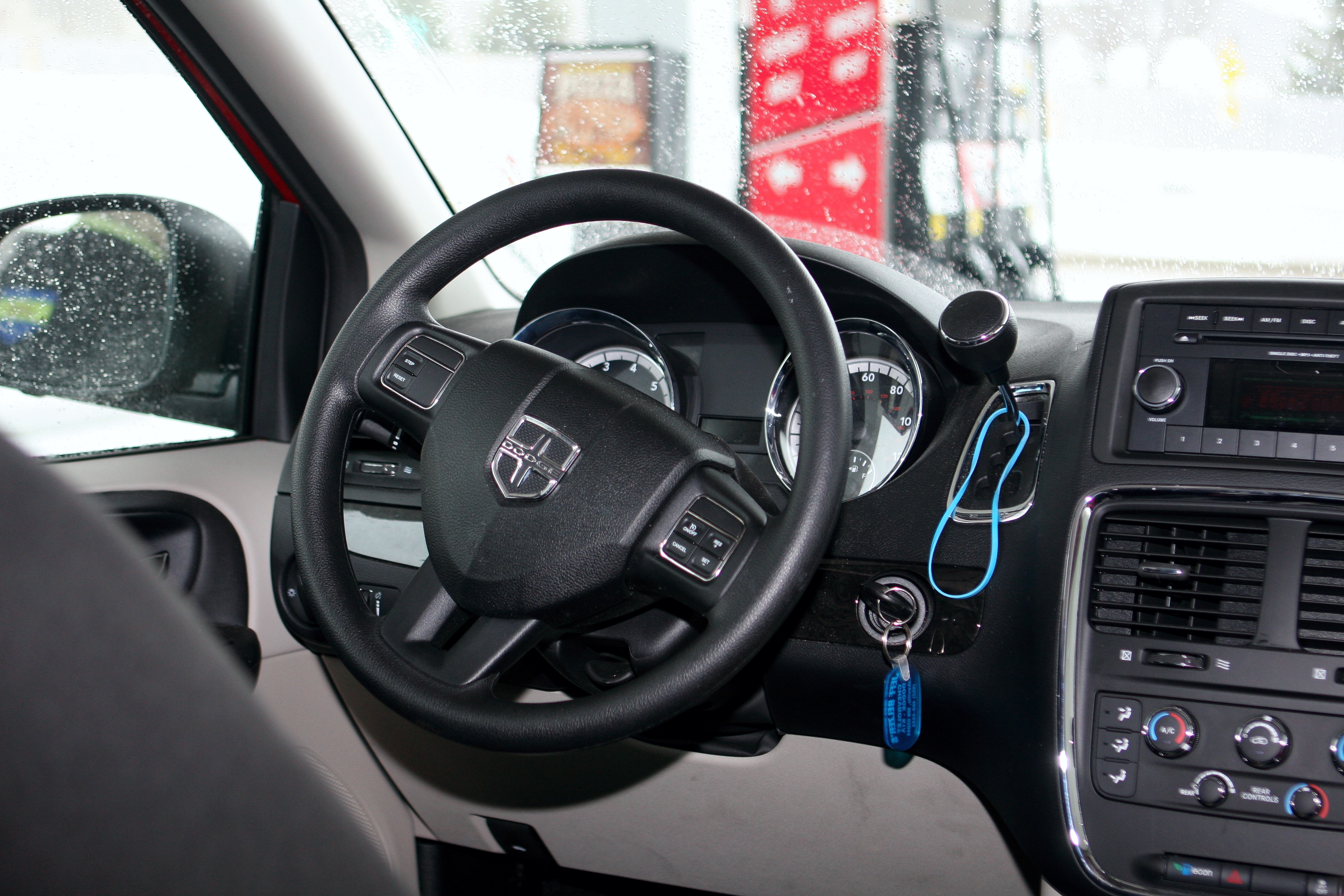
Interior, 2011–2020

The Grand Caravan underwent a mid-cycle refresh for the 2011 model year, which included major changes in both styling and functionality. The suspension was heavily re-tuned, with both Dodge and Chrysler minivans gaining a larger front sway bar and new rear sway bar, increased rear roll center height, adjusted spring rates, a new steering gear, a revised front static camber setting, and lowered ride height.

All three of the former engine choices were replaced by the new Pentastar 3.6-liter V6 with six-speed automatic transmission, now the sole powertrain choice for all models. Interior trim was restyled on both vans, in addition to major exterior revisions highlighted by the new "double-crosshair" grille on the Grand Caravan. The Grand Caravan no longer had its own distinct headlight assemblies, and now shared a common design with the Town & Country.

Other changes included extra sound insulation, acoustic glass, new seats, softer-touch surfaces, new LED ambient lighting and center console, and halogen projector headlamps with LED accents. The Chrysler models were adjusted so that instead of competing against equivalent Dodge trim levels, they were above Dodge in trim and features. The door chime was also updated in 2011 to match the rest of the Chrysler line-up.

==== 2012 model year ====
2012 Dodge Grand Caravan rear view

For 2012, a new basic style trim called "AVP" was introduced, while some features previously unavailable for "SE" (like touch navigation panel) become available as options (the "SE" now also received a floor console, similar to the one available for "SXT"). The same year, the front logo design was changed, gaining the two slanted rectangles in red to match the rest of the Dodge lineup. For 2013, the American Value Package "AVP" trim manufacturer's suggested retail price (MSRP) was reduced by $1,000 from the year before.

==== 2013 model year ====
The Grand Caravan added a class-exclusive feature with an optional Blu-ray and DVD player, while the base "AVP" model was described by Autotrader.com editors as having a "shockingly low MSRP", giving buyers "incredible utility" in their vehicle.

==== 2014 model year ====
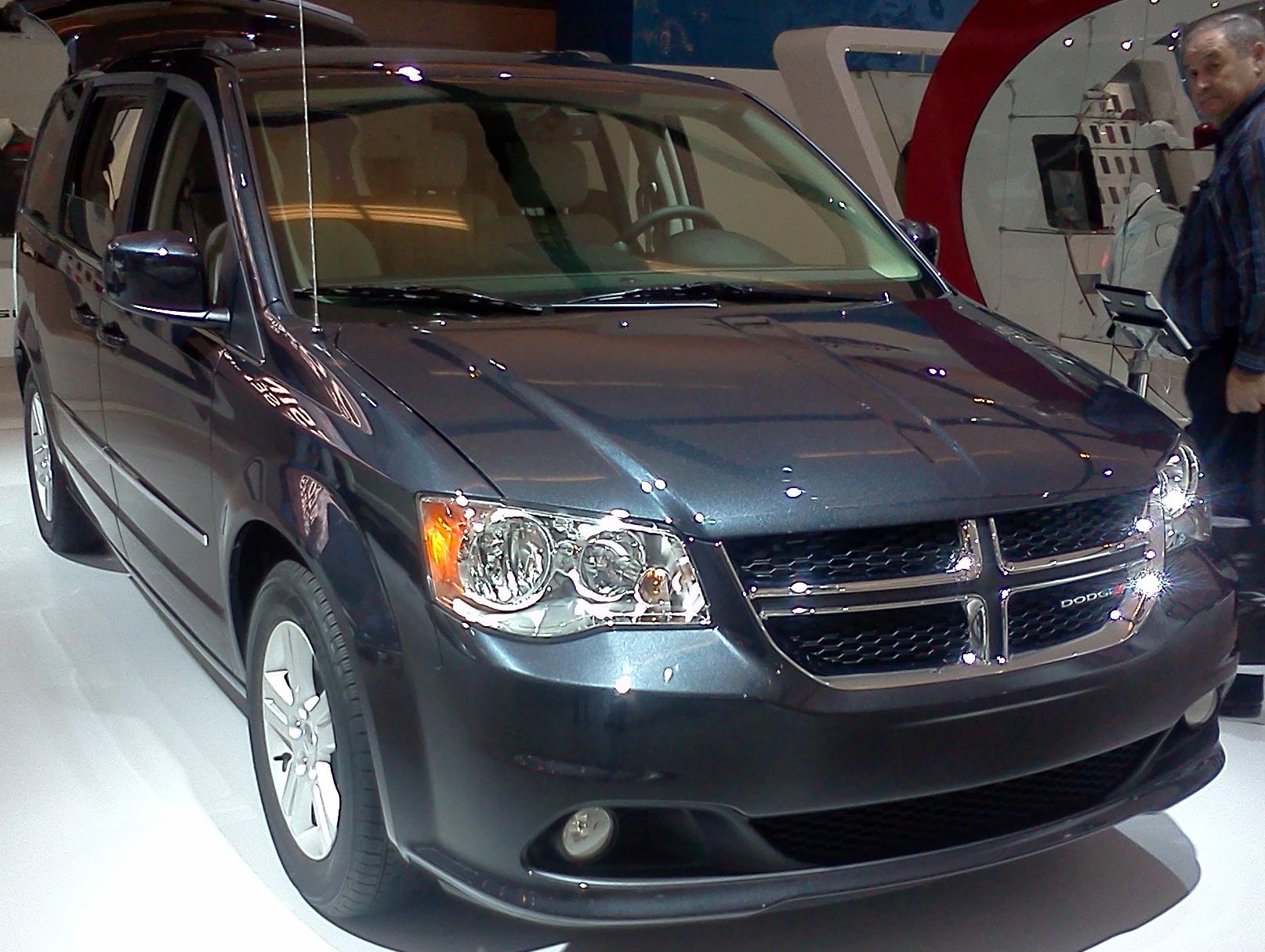
2014 Dodge Grand Caravan 30th Anniversary Edition on display at the Montreal Auto Show, 22 January 2014

For the 2014 model year, three new packages were introduced: American Value Package (US), Canada Value Package (Canada), Blacktop package (US only), and the 30th Anniversary Edition. They are all different sets of SE and SXT trims, and include new luxury features for the same price. The Grand Caravan AVP also gained easy-clean floor mats that came with the optional second-row Stow'n Go seats (standard on SE, SXT, and R/T).

The "Blacktop Package", based on SE and SXT, came equipped with 17-inch polished aluminum wheels with gloss black pockets, a gloss black grille, black headlamp bezels, an all-black interior including headliner, door panels and console, unique black cloth seats and door trim panels with silver accent stitching, a leather-wrapped steering wheel with silver accent stitching and a leather shift knob, choice of six body colors (Granite Crystal, Billet Silver, Brilliant Black, Maximum Steel, Redline Red, and Bright White). SXT models also include fog lamps.

The "SE 30th Anniversary Edition", based on the SE trim, came equipped with 17-inch satin carbon aluminum wheels, body-color heated exterior mirrors, 30th Anniversary badging on the front fenders, silver accent stitching and piano black accents throughout, black cloth seats, a black leather-wrapped steering wheel, black leather-wrapped shift knob, black headliner and overhead console, bright heating and air conditioning trim bezels, power second- and third-row windows, and 30th Anniversary logo on the key fob.

The "SXT 30th Anniversary Edition", based on the SXT trim, was packaged with 17-inch polished aluminum wheels with satin carbon pockets, bright chrome roof rack, bright window trim moldings, fog lamps, automatic headlamps, and special 30th Anniversary badging, Black Torino leatherette seats with premium faux suede inserts and silver accent stitching, power 10-way driver's seat, piano black accent trim bezels, and bright chrome accents throughout.

Both 30th Anniversary Editions included an available special body color, Granite Crystal Pearl Coat, a customized gauge cluster with 30th Anniversary badging, as well as the UConnect Handsfree Group (SiriusXM Satellite Radio with a one-year subscription, Bluetooth streaming audio and voice command, and an auto-dimming rear view mirror). The vehicles arrived at dealerships in the third quarter of 2013.

Also new for the 2014 model year, the Grand Caravan R/T gained standard auto headlamps with black bezels and the Security Group, featuring remote start and security alarm.

==== 2015 model year ====
The Grand Caravan was not changed for the 2015 model year, except for content features added to SE Plus and SXT Plus trims. The SE Plus package included black leather upholstery, power windows for the second-row seats, and Chrysler's Uconnect voice command with Bluetooth sound system.

==== 2016 model year ====
The new Chrysler Pacifica was unveiled on January 11, 2016, but the Dodge Grand Caravan continued to be marketed as a budget minivan alternative.

==== 2017 model year ====
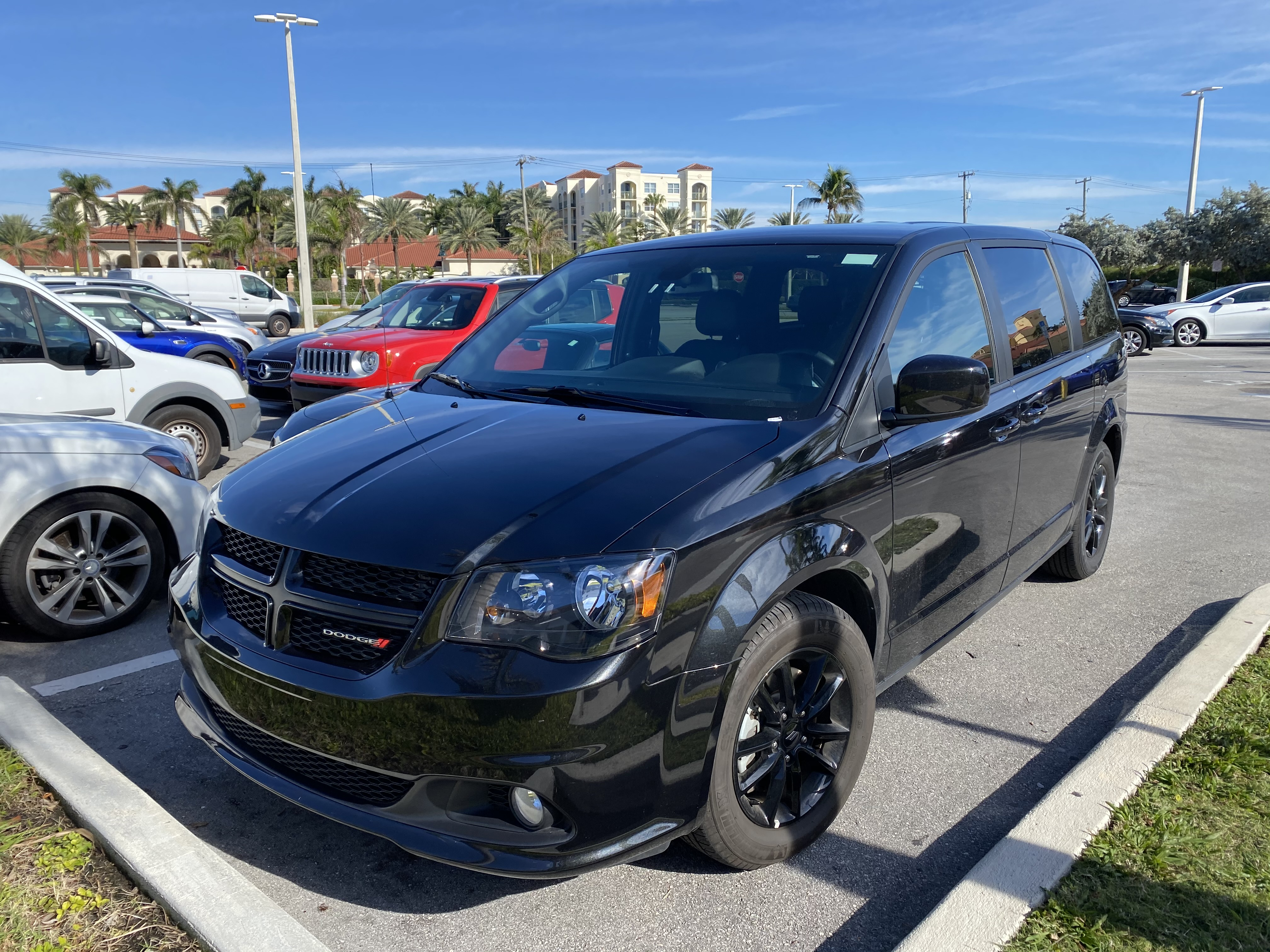
Dodge Grand Caravan GT

A small update for the 2017 model year was applied to SE, SE Plus, SXT and GT (replacing the R/T) models. The 6.5-inch Touchscreen (Radio 430 and 430 NAV) became standard equipment with rear-view cameras on all models (navigation is standard on GT and optional on SXT). The GT model also included monochromatic exterior and premium leather interior with red accent stitching.

Sales of the Grand Caravan began in Mexico during this model year, positioned as the most accessible minivan in its class. Three models available in the Mexican market were SE, SXT, and SXT Plus.

At the 2016 North American International Auto Show, FCA unveiled the Chrysler Pacifica, a new minivan for the 2017 model year. The Pacifica replaced the Chrysler Town & Country, but it was originally stated that the 2016 model of the Dodge Caravan would be produced for one more model year as a lower-cost alternative to the Pacifica before being discontinued. In January 2017, FCA CEO Sergio Marchionne stated that it was not clear if the Caravan would be discontinued, and that the company would have to look into offering "some level of affordable access to the Pacifica at the lower end to try and replace the outgoing models" (this would eventually come in the form of the sixth-generation Voyager, which was briefly produced alongside the RT Caravan). Despite the introduction of the higher-cost Pacifica, sales of the Caravan increased by 26% in 2016. A substantial number of Caravans are sold to low-margin rental fleets. The vehicle continued to be positioned for price-conscious customers, and drew traffic to dealerships when the vehicle was aggressively priced. Additionally, FCA provided various rebates and incentives to assist purchases of the Grand Caravan and other models by customers with credit scores of less than 620.

According to a report by an automotive journalist, this strategy helps the Chrysler Pacifica hold its value better while also having a more affordable minivan available. Over 60% of the Dodge Caravan's sales went to fleet sales, and the vehicle was the second best-selling vehicle for rental fleet sales.

==== 2018 model year ====
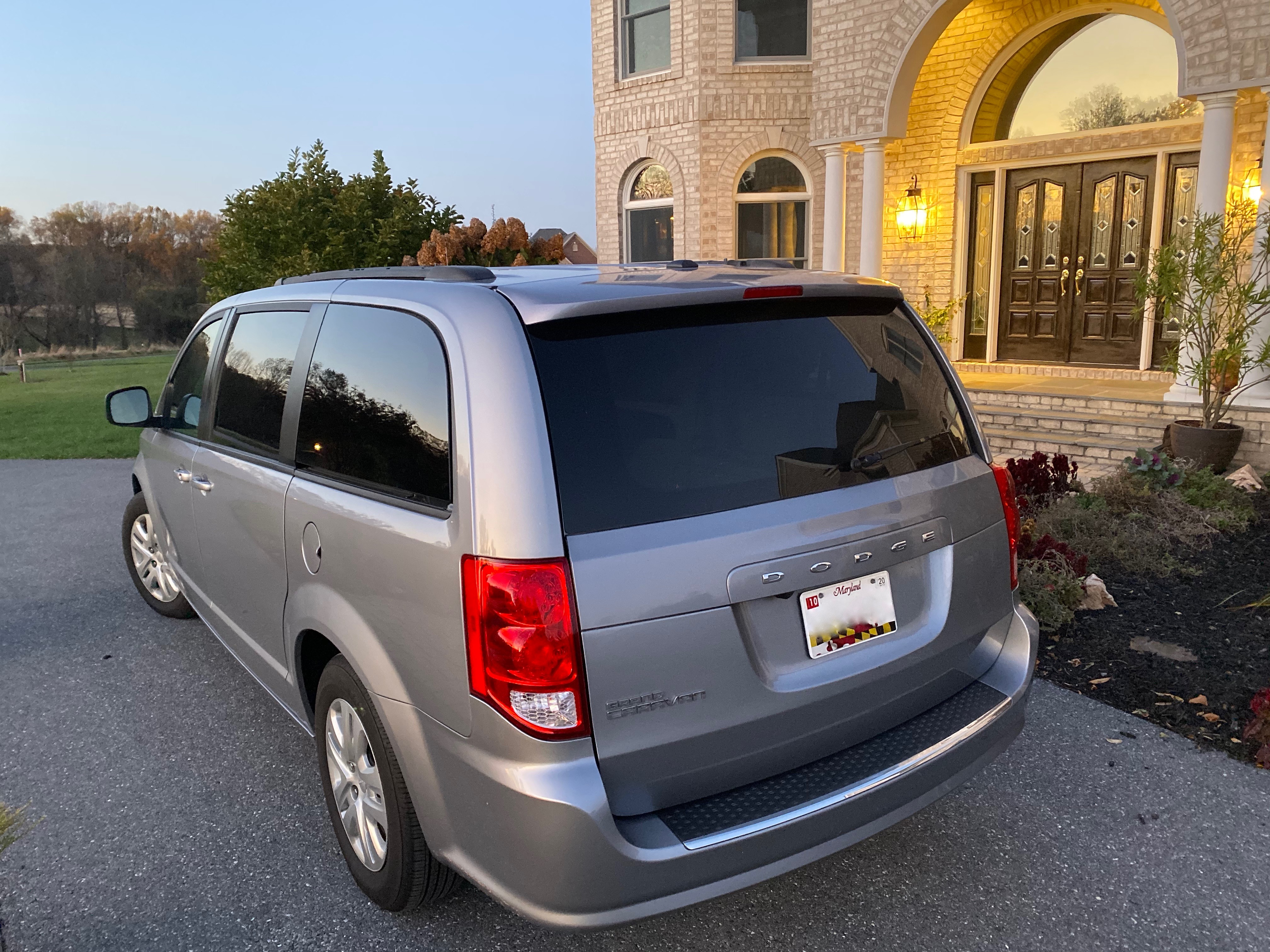
2018 Dodge Grand Caravan SE

Production of Grand Caravans was temporarily suspended from September to November 2017, with the assembly of the 2018 model year versions starting in December 2017. The production line required changes to install airbags that meet U.S. Federal Motor Vehicle Safety Standard 226, which called for larger and more robust side-impact air curtains, as well as for them to deploy in the event of either a side-on collision or a rollover. Beginning with the 2018 models, changes included advanced multistage driver and front-passenger airbags that include low-risk deployment, a driver's-side inflatable knee blocker, front seat-mounted side airbags, and side-curtains for outboard passengers in all three rows.

For 2018, the Grand Caravan was Dodge's best-selling vehicle, while the sales of foreign-branded minivans fared worse than the Dodge in 2018. Sales in Canada dropped 30 percent, significantly lower than in the previous six years.

==== 2019 model year ====
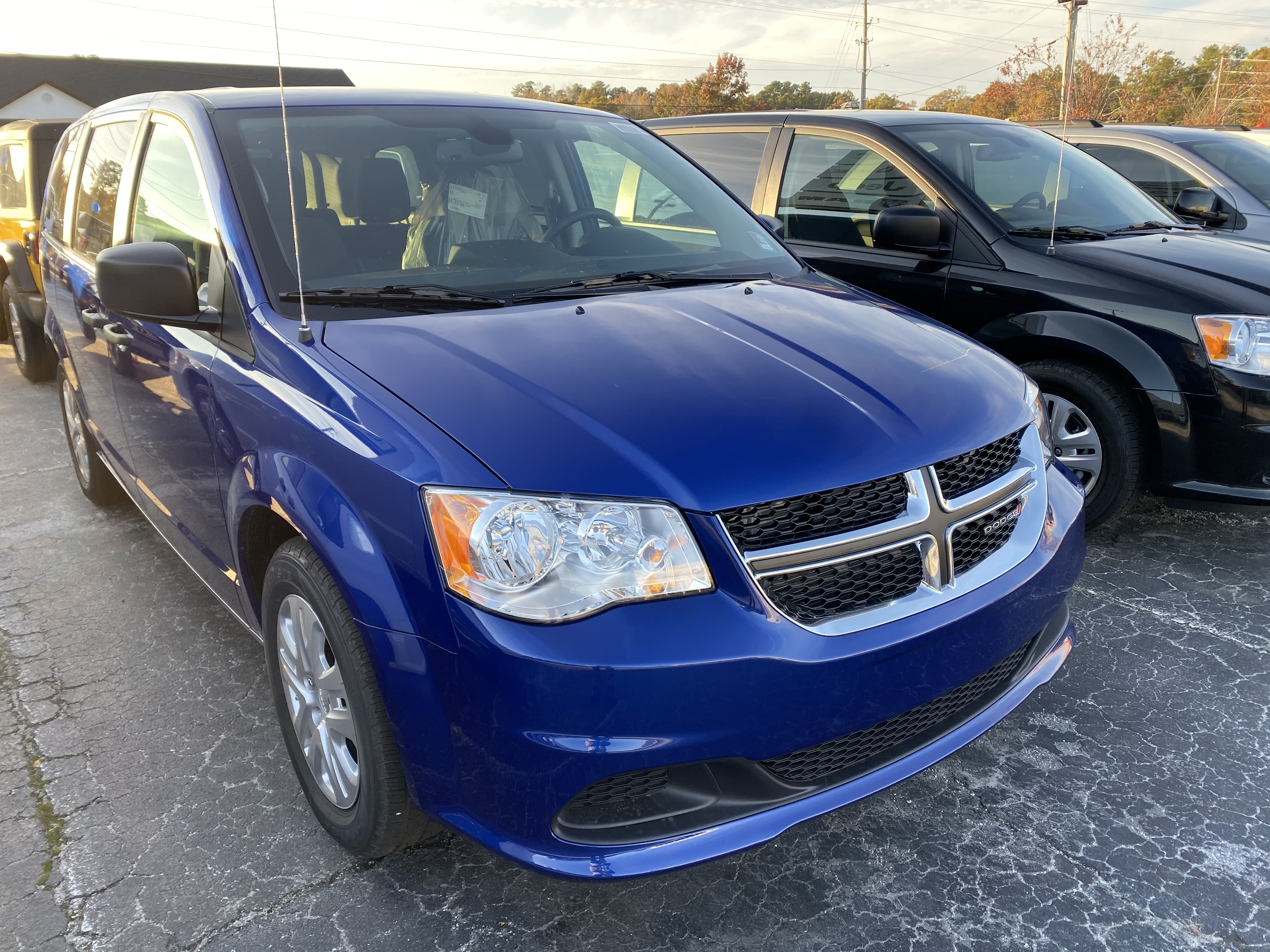
2019 Dodge Grand Caravan

The 2019 model year marked the 35th anniversary of the Chrysler minivans. A commemorative trim option was available on the SE and SXT models that included a bright grille, 17-inch "tech silver" aluminum wheels, a 35th Anniversary fender badge, "piano black" console and instrument panel accents, and front floor mats with an embroidered 35th Anniversary logo. A "Blacktop Package" featuring a black grille and headlamp bezels as well as an all-black interior was optional on 35th anniversary edition SE and SXT models.

The minivan market segment decreased in general. Sales of the Grand Caravan models in Canada declined by 9% during the first quarter of 2019, but it was still number 10 among the best-selling vehicles for that period in Canada. Most sales went to rental and fleet customers. The vehicle did not receive major changes, but continued to be produced because Dodge "sold more than 125,000 Grand Caravans last year [2018], while Honda only sold 100,000 of its Odyssey minivans during the same year [2018]."

The third shift at Windsor minivan plant ended in October 2019 due to sluggish sales, eliminating 1,500 direct jobs.

==== 2020 model year ====
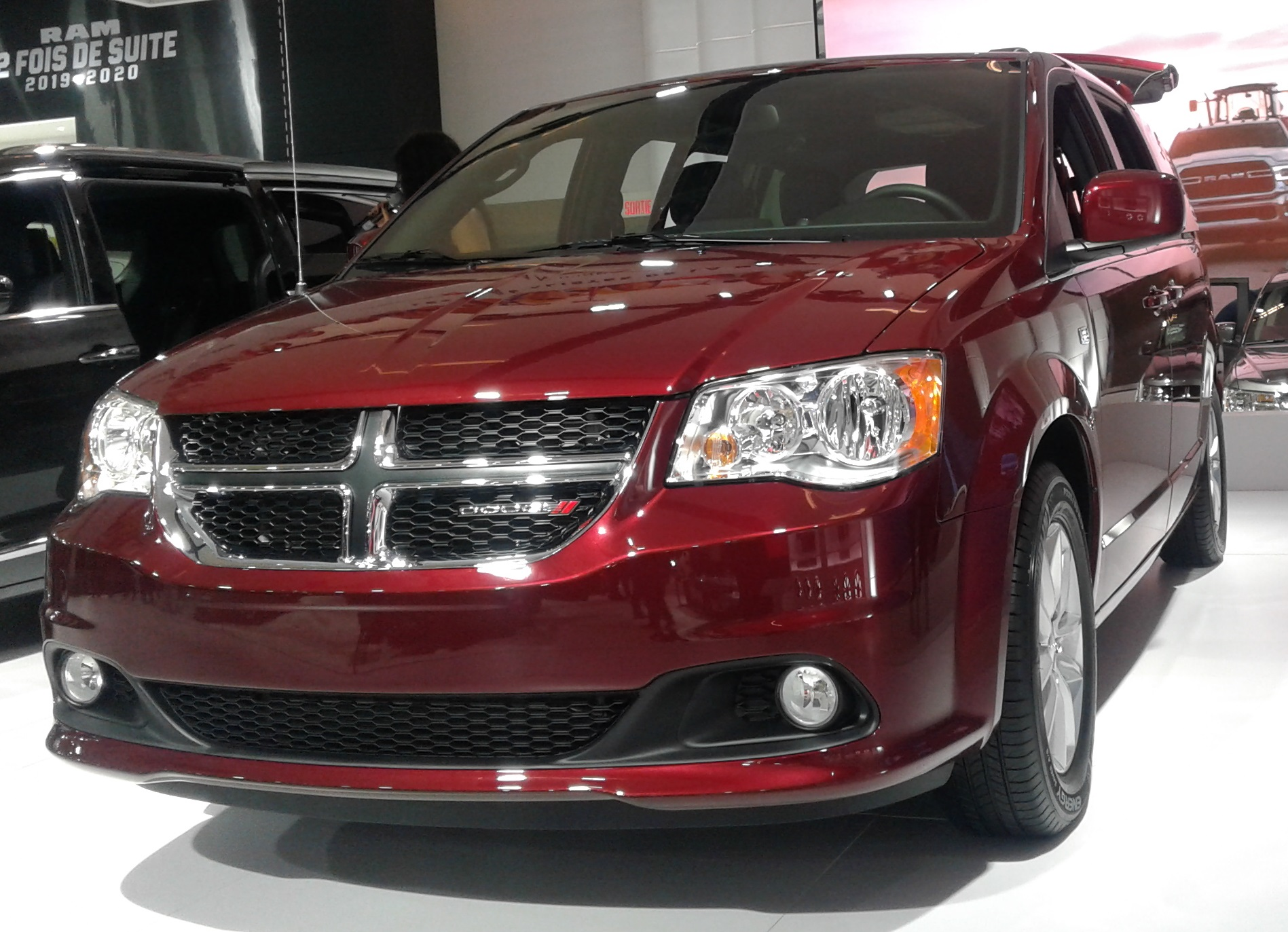
2020 Dodge Grand Caravan

Three models were available: SE, SE Plus, SXT, and GT. The Grand Caravan SE Plus model now included standard second-row Super Stow 'n Go bucket seats, a power eight-way driver seat, and an all-black interior with cranberry wine accent stitching on the seats. The optional "Blacktop Package" continued for the SE Plus and SXT models.

The Canadian market included six models, starting from an entry-level version and then increasing the standard equipment on each: CVP, SXT, SXT Premium Plus, Crew, Crew Plus, and the GT, which includes many convenience features as well as a performance suspension system and a monochromatic exterior. The "Blacktop Package" trim option is available on SXT models.

Trim levels for the Mexican market were unchanged from previous model years, with SE, SXT, and SXT Plus models available.

=== Discontinuation ===
For 2017, Chrysler released its sixth-generation minivan line, replacing the Chrysler Town & Country with Chrysler Pacifica. While the Dodge Grand Caravan was 9 years old and was originally slated for discontinuation after 2016 (alongside the Town & Country), FCA cited strong fleet sales and its popularity in Canada (its place of assembly) as reasons to maintain the model line, marketing it as an entry-level vehicle priced below the Pacifica.

While 2020 was announced as the final model year, the ultimate end of production was extended multiple times. In production for nearly 37 years (13 years on the fifth-generation RT platform), the final Dodge Grand Caravan rolled off the Windsor assembly line on August 21, 2020.

=== Safety ===
In the U.S. National Highway Traffic Safety Administration (NHTSA)'s New Car Assessment Program crash testing, the 2020 Dodge Grand Caravan achieved an overall four-star rating.

Frontal Impact – Driver and Passenger:	4/5 stars
Side Impact Driver:	5/5 stars
Side Impact Rear Passenger:	5/5 stars
Rollover:	4/5 stars

IIHS:
Moderate overlap frontal offset	Good
Small overlap frontal offset	Poor
Side impact	Good
Roof strength (2012–present models)	Good

=== Variants ===
==== Europe ====
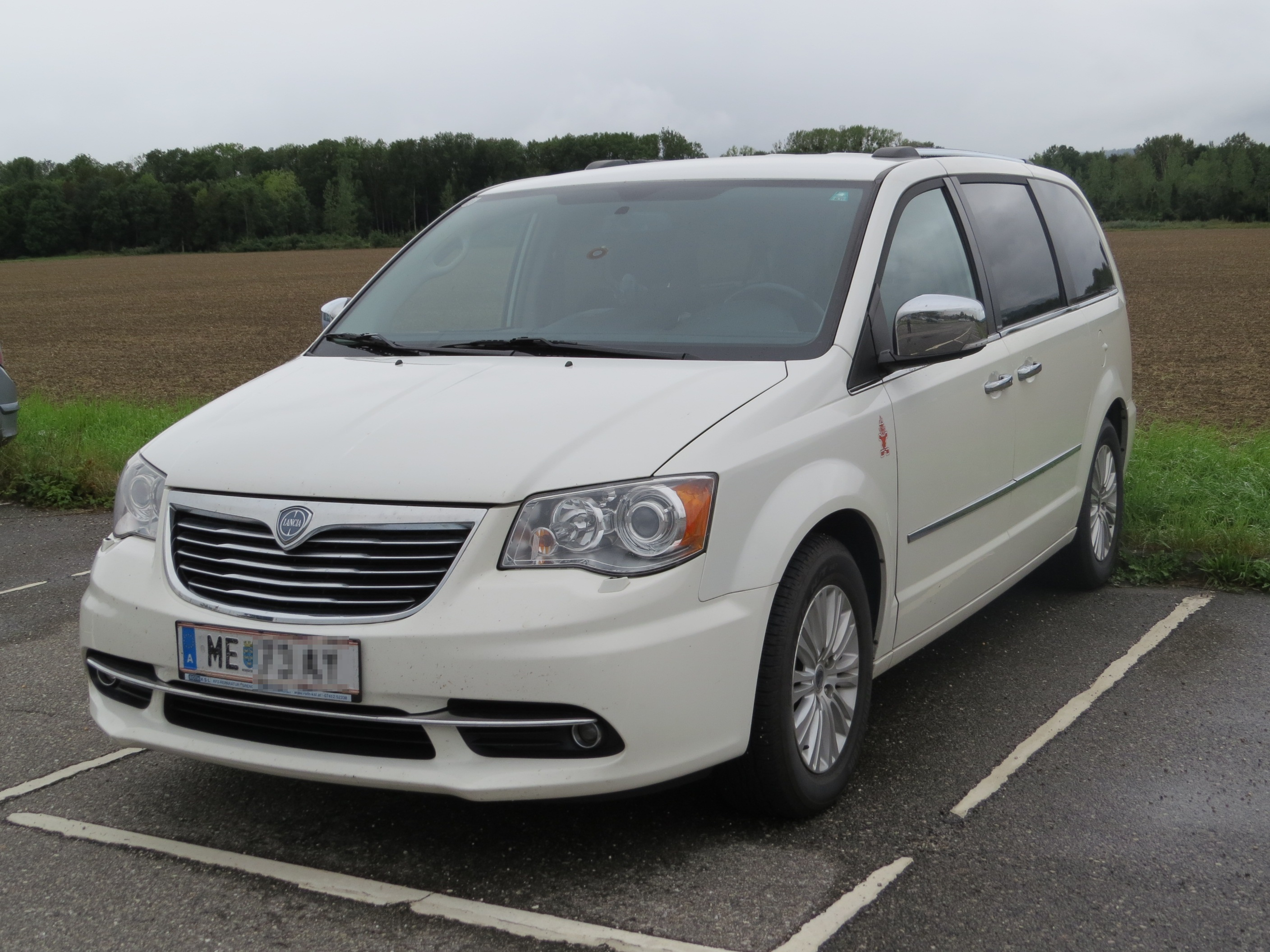
Lancia Voyager (Austria)

As with preceding generations, Chrysler marketed the Caravan in Europe as the Chrysler Voyager, with the fifth-generation becoming exclusively sold as the long-wheelbase Grand Voyager. From 2007 to June 2011, the model line was sold under the Chrysler brand; following the acquisition of Chrysler by Fiat, the Voyager was rebranded as a Lancia in continental Europe (with the Chrysler Voyager remaining in Ireland and the UK).

The Chrysler/Lancia Voyager was marketed under three trim lines distinct to Europe (Silver, Gold, and Platinum). The standard engine was a 2.8 L I4 diesel (producing 161 hp), with a 3.6 L gasoline V6 (producing 279 hp); both engines were paired to a six-speed automatic.

Following the 2016 model year, exports of the Voyager were discontinued as Fiat Chrysler reorganized its brands, with Chrysler remaining largely in North America and Lancia sold exclusively in Italy.

==== Ram Cargo Van (Ram C/V Tradesman) ====
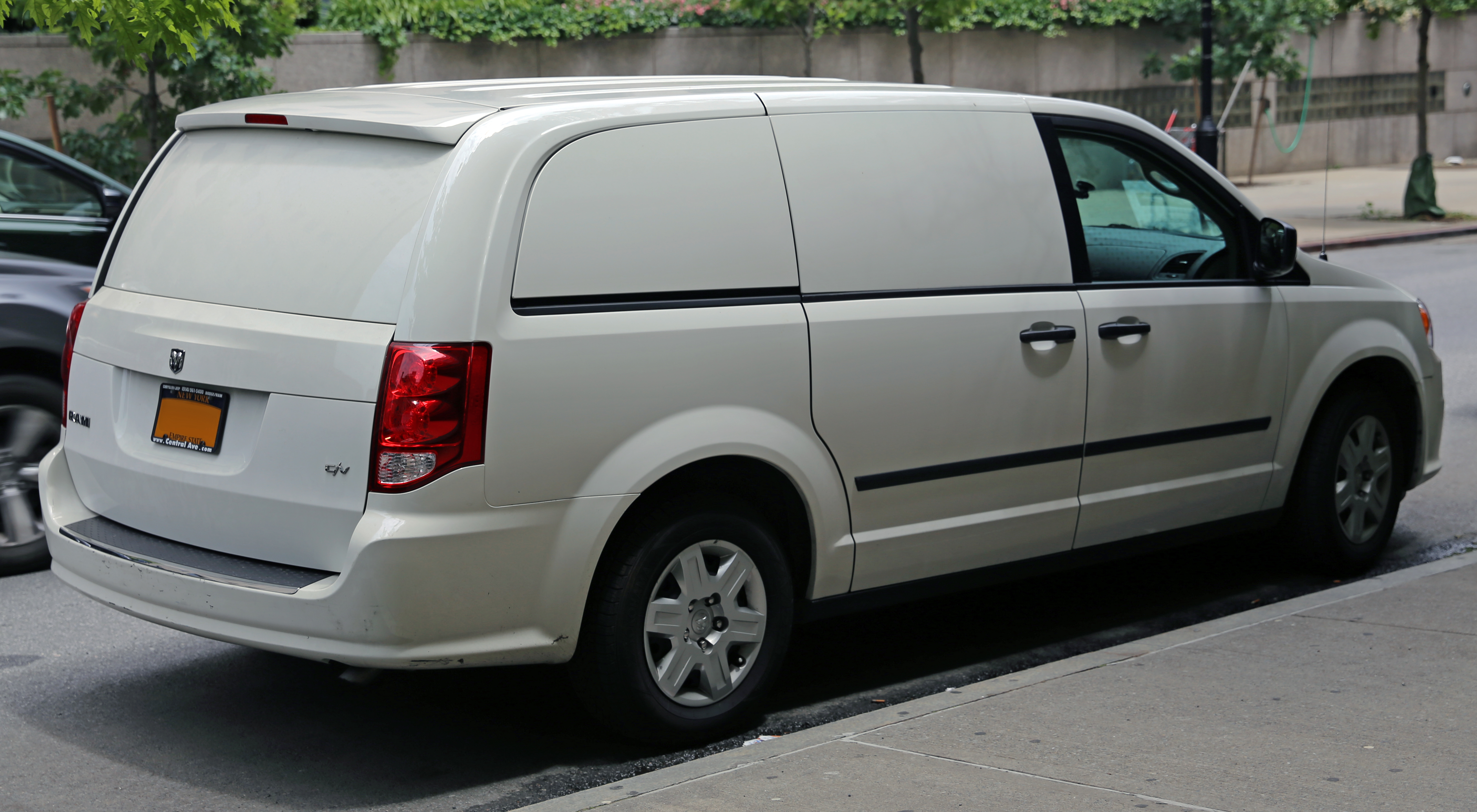
2012 Ram C/V Tradesman

For the 2012 model year, the Ram Trucks division received the Dodge Grand Caravan C/V cargo van, which was renamed the Ram Cargo (C/V) Tradesman (a name previously used by Dodge for its full-size cargo vans during the 1970s). In contrast to its predecessor, the Tradesman was strictly a two-seat vehicle, with solid metal body paneling in place of rear windows and a flat rear load floor.

As the Ram brand increased its use of Fiat-based vehicles, the Tradesman was replaced for 2016 by the ProMaster City, an American-market version of the Fiat Doblò.

==== Volkswagen Routan ====
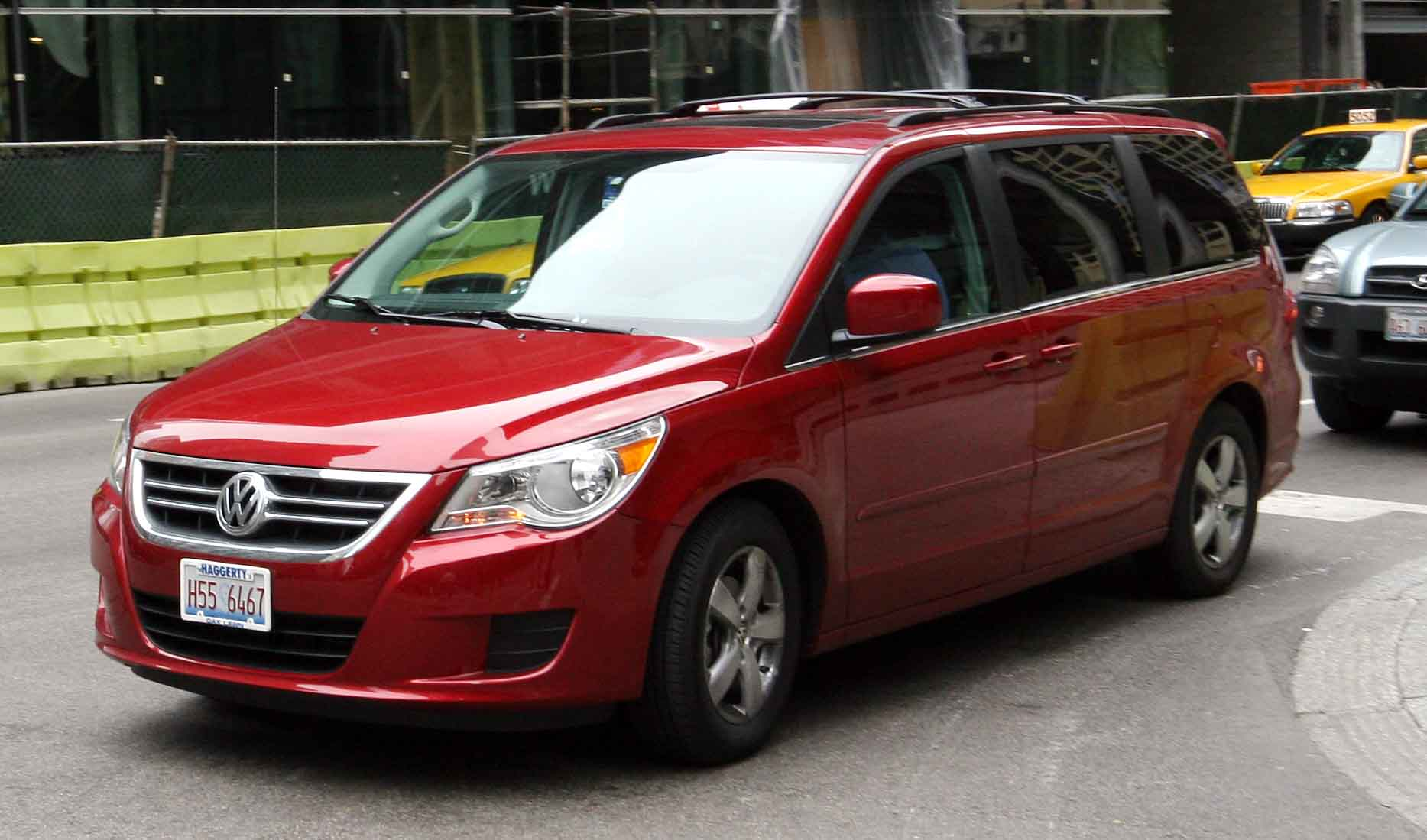
Volkswagen Routan SE

After a five-year hiatus, Volkswagen re-entered the North American minivan segment by introducing the Volkswagen Routan for the 2009 model year. Replacing the EuroVan in North America, the Routan was sold in the United States, Canada, and Mexico. As a lower-cost alternative to either federalizing the Transporter T5 or the Sharan, Volkswagen entered into a 5-year production agreement with Chrysler, who manufactured the Routan alongside the Grand Caravan and Town & Country at its Windsor Assembly facility.

While the Routan shared much of its body with the Grand Caravan, it received model-specific front and rear fascias, along with a slightly different window line. The chassis retained a shared powertrain, with a standard 3.8 L V6 and an optional 4.0 L V6 and a 6-speed automatic (a Pentastar 3.6 L V6 became standard in 2011). The Routan differed from the Grand Caravan with its own (stiffer) suspension tuning; the stiffer suspension settings were adopted by Dodge for 2011.

The interior was restyled slightly by Volkswagen, partly to bring the Routan in line with its other American-market product lines; in a design change, Chrysler required the Routan to use the 1990s-style Easy-Out Roller Seat configuration (becoming the last Chrysler-designed minivans equipped with lift-out seats). For 2011, much of the interior was largely carried over.

Falling far under sales expectations, the final VW Routans were produced by Chrysler in August 2012; all 2013 sales were sourced from dealer inventory, with 2014 vehicles sold exclusively by fleets. Originally predicting to sell 50,000 units per year, Volkswagen sold 57,683 Routans through its four years of production. As Volkswagen shifted to SUVs in North America, the Routan minivan was replaced for 2018 by the three-row Atlas (also developed as the successor for the Touareg in North America).

== Sixth generation (2021-present; Chrysler Grand Caravan) ==
Sixth generation (Chrysler Grand Caravan)
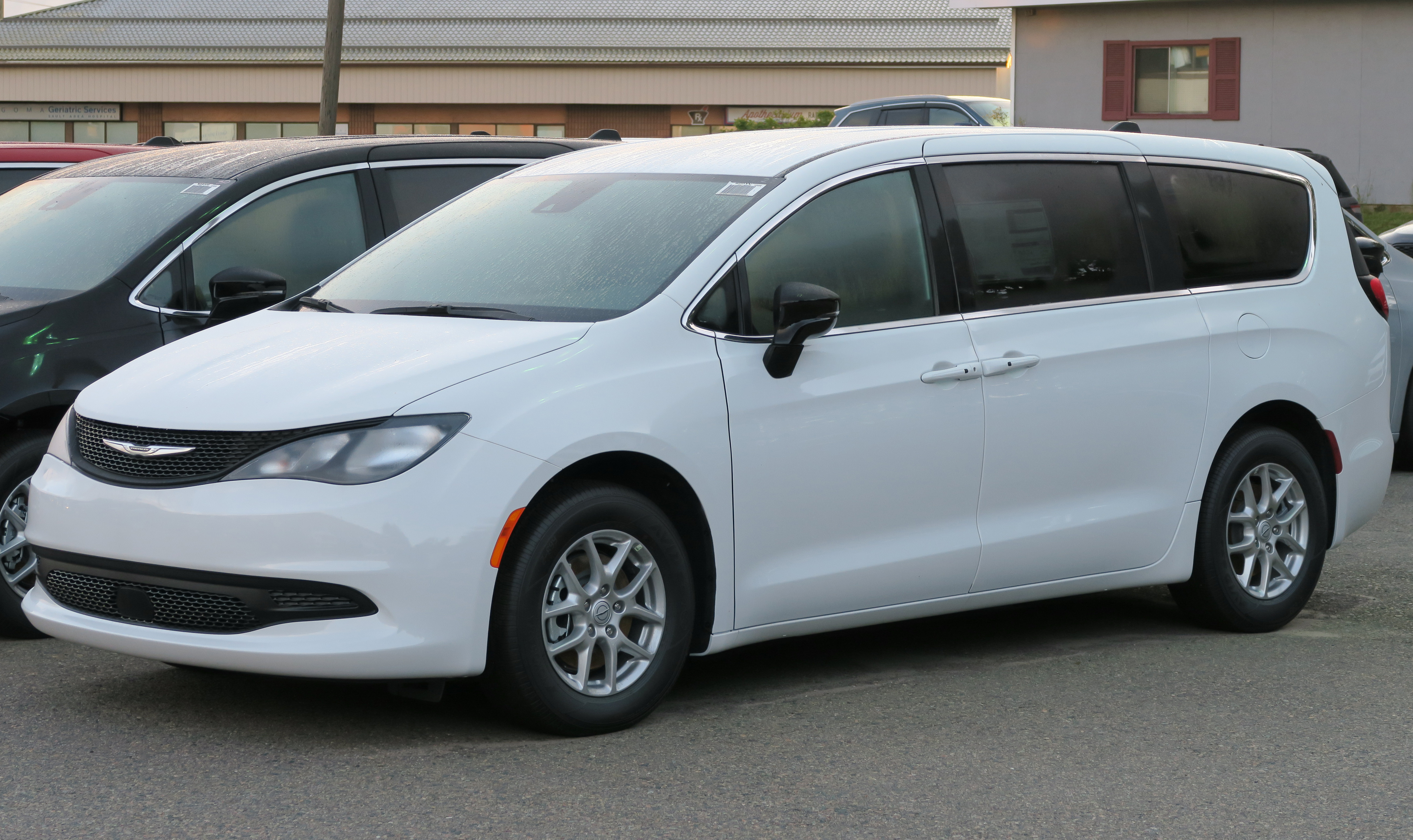
- 2025 Chrysler Grand Caravan SXT

Overview
- Model code: RU
- Also called: Chrysler Voyager (United States)
- Model years: 2021-present
- Assembly: Canada: Windsor Assembly Plant (Windsor, Ontario)

Body and chassis
- Class: Minivan
- Body style: 5-door van
- Platform: Chrysler RU platform
- Related: Chrysler Pacifica

Powertrain
- Engine: 3.6 L Pentastar V6
- Transmission: ZF 948TE 9-speed automatic

Dimensions
- Wheelbase: 121.6 in (3,089 mm)
- Length: 203.6 in (5,171 mm)
- Width: 79.6 in (2,022 mm)
- Height: 69.9 in (1,775 mm)

Chronology
- Predecessor: Dodge Grand Caravan

For 2021, Chrysler followed the previous year's revival of the Voyager nameplate by bringing the Grand Caravan under the Chrysler brand. Replacing entry-level trims of the Pacifica minivan, the Voyager is sold in the United States, while the Grand Caravan is marketed in Canada. Despite only offering one body length of minivans since 2008, Chrysler retained the "Grand" prefix from its long-wheelbase variants for the Grand Caravan.

While the Grand Caravan differs from the Voyager only in nameplate badging, both models are visually distinguished from the Pacifica in their exterior styling. Along with its lack of foglights, the Grand Caravan is styled with the 2017-style front fascia and separate rear taillamps.

For 2022, the standard-trim Grand Caravan SE was dropped, making the upgraded SXT trim standard. While fitted with a standard 7-inch touchscreen (instead of the 10.1-inch unit of the Pacifica), the SXT was upgraded with updated Uconnect 5 software (including six speakers and active noise cancellation). For 2023, the SXT remained the only available trim, again serving as the entry-level version of the Pacifica.

The 2024 model year saw the addition of two new exterior colors: Baltic Grey and Red Hot.

== Sales ==
Calendar year	United States	Canada	Mexico	Total
2002	244,911			244,911
2003	233,394			233,394
2004	242,307	63,559		305,866
2005	226,771	65,002		291,773
2006	211,140	61,901		273,041
2007	176,150	55,041		231,191
2008	123,749	39,396		163,145
2009	90,666	40,283		130,949
2010	103,323	55,306		158,629
2011	110,862	53,406		164,268
2012	141,468	51,552		193,020
2013	124,019	46,732		170,751
2014	134,152	51,759		185,911
2015	97,141	46,927		144,068
2016	127,678	51,513	496	179,191
2017	125,196	46,933	786	172,195
2018	151,927	32,266	1,732	185,925
2019	122,648	27,382	631	150,661
2020	38,765	22,884	227	54,756
Subtotal	2,824.137	807,334	3,872	
Total Sales	3,635.343			
