= MERCON =

Trade name for automatic transmission fluid standards

Mercon

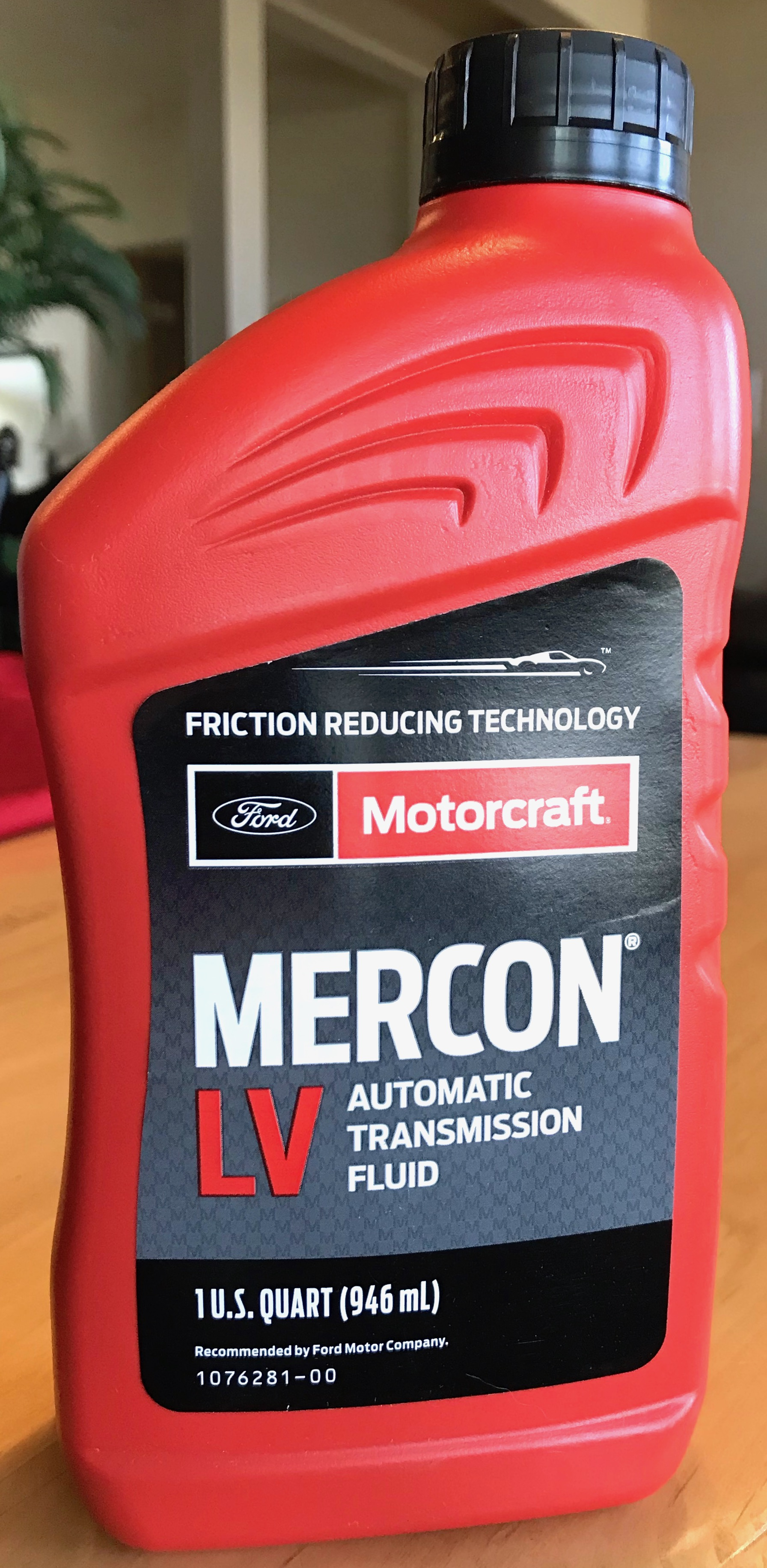
- Bottle of Mercon LV ATF
- Product type: Automatic transmission fluid
- Current owner: Ford
- Produced by: Ford
- Country: U.S.
- Introduced: 1987; 39 years ago
- Related brands: Motorcraft; Dexron; Chrysler ATF

Mercon represents a series of technical standards for automatic transmission fluid, developed and trademarked by Ford Motor Company. This designation serves as a mark of quality that Ford has established for fluids used in automatic transmissions. The Mercon name, which has evolved into a brand, is licensed by Ford to various manufacturers. These companies are authorized to produce the fluid according to Ford's specifications and market it under their own brand names.

The specifications outlined under the Mercon label cover various aspects such as viscosity, friction characteristics, and thermal stability. Licensed fluids carry a Ford license number; for example, one licensed MERCON LV fluid is sold under license number MLV190802.

== Overview ==
The original Mercon (M2C185-A) Transmission Fluid was introduced in January 1987. Over the years, the original Mercon was supplanted by Mercon "V", Mercon "SP", Mercon "LV", and Mercon "ULV", which is the latest automatic transmission fluid. Ford has upgraded the Mercon specifications over the years; the newer fluids are not always backward compatible with previous fluids. Newer 6 and 10-speed transmissions as well as Plug-In Hybrid (PHEV), and Electric Vehicle (EV) transmission technologies require specialized fluids to operate properly. There remains a market for older fluids that claim to meet the earlier fluid specifications. See the details below for the backward compatibility of each fluid.

Originally the name MERCON was associated exclusively with automatic transmission fluids, later Ford released MERCON Gear oils and other lubricants under the MERCON brand. Not all Mercon fluids are licensed for reselling under another brand name. All licensed Mercon fluids must have a license number on the container. If no license number is found, the fluid may not be Ford-approved and the automatic transmission fluid cannot be guaranteed to meet Ford specifications. Ford, like many automobile manufacturers, uses transmissions sourced from other suppliers or transmission manufacturers around the world; these transmissions are not manufactured by Ford. Many of these automatic transmissions use unique fluids that might not be shown on this page.

== History ==
=== Before Mercon: 1942–1987 ===
==== 1942 – Motor Oil ====
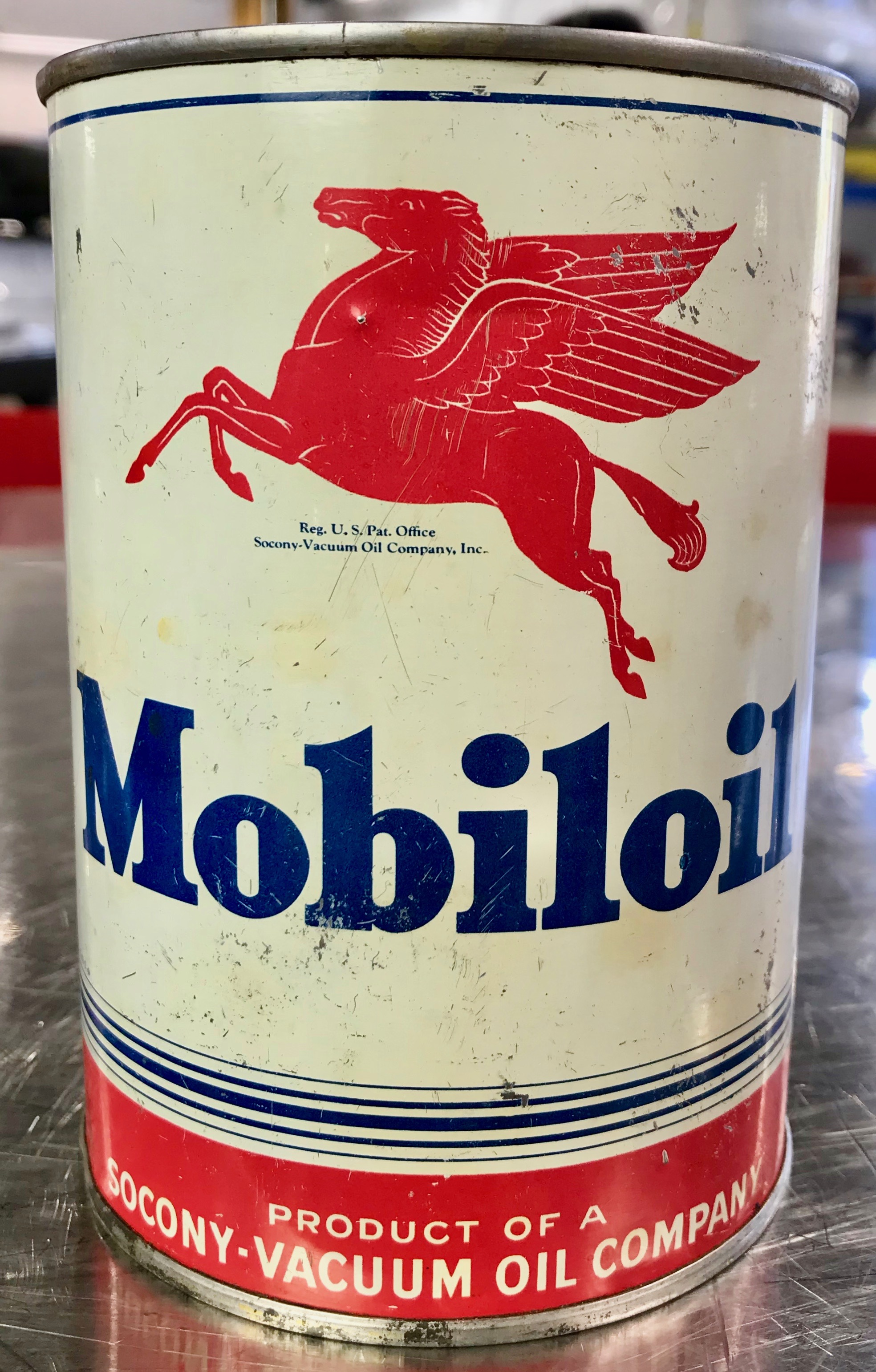
1942 Mobiloil

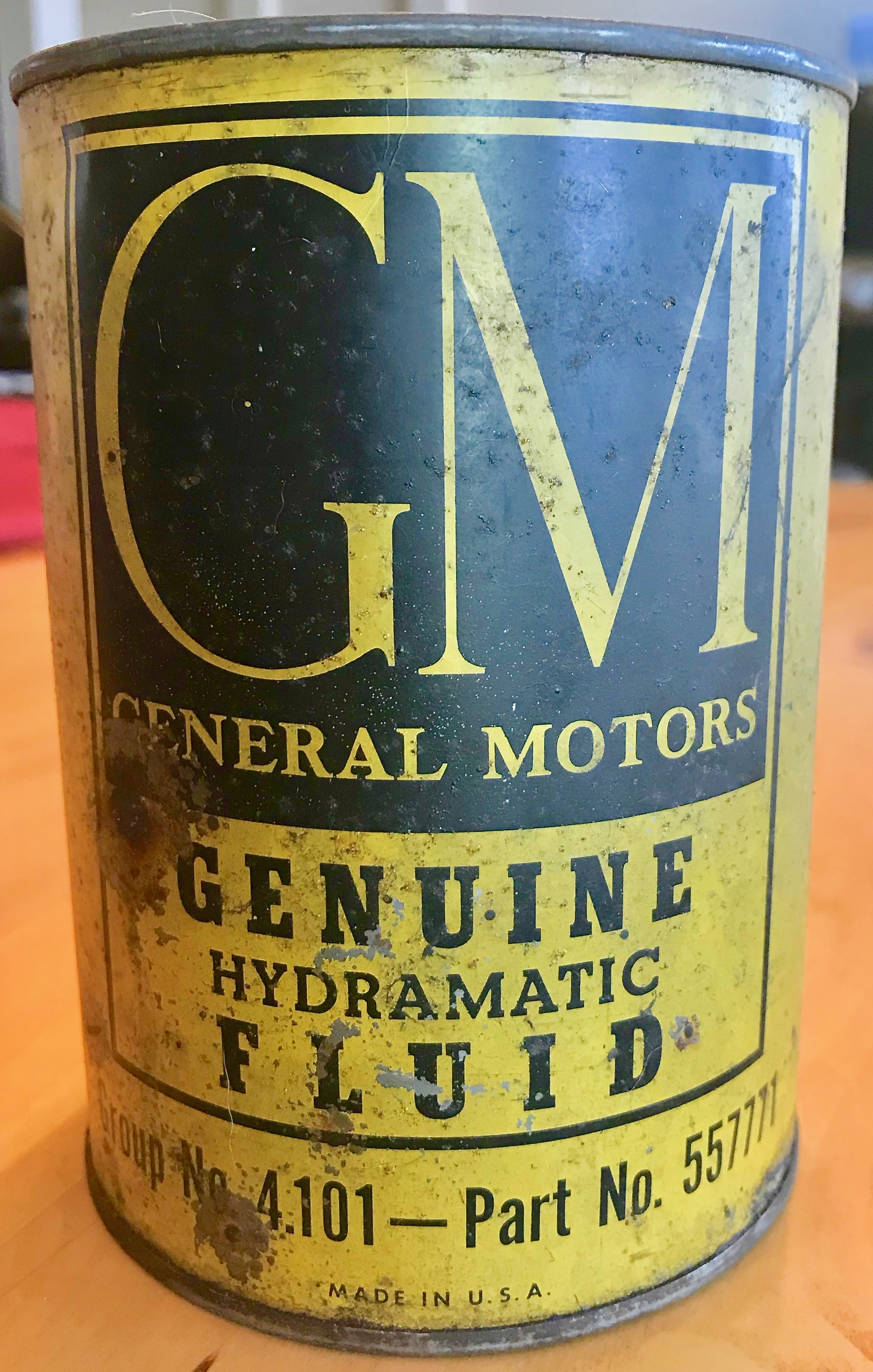
1950 Hydra-Matic fluid

1942 Mobiloil motor oil, used in the Liquamatic Drive fluid coupling; 1950 GM Hydra-Matic Drive Fluid.

In 1942, The Mercury 8 and Lincoln offered cars with an optional "Liquamatic Drive" using a fluid coupling, conventional clutch, and semi-automatic three-speed transmission. The transmission had an overrunning clutch on the transmission countershaft. The flywheel's fluid coupling used S.A.E 10 motor oil for lubrication. The transmission gearbox used traditional gear oil. This transmission was only produced for a few months before the U.S.A. entered World War II, production of this transmission was not resumed after the war.

==== 1949 – GM Hydra-Matic Fluid ====
In April 1949, Lincoln began offering the General Motors Hydra-Matic 4-speed automatic transmission in their 1950 model year vehicles. This offering continued through the 1954 model year. Lincoln service information calls for "Lincoln Automatic Transmission Fluid". This fluid met the GM Hydra-Matic Drive fluid specifications.

This Fluid was First Used in the Following Transmissions:

- 1949 Hydra-Matic with an L-9 serial number prefix
- 1950 Hydra-Matic with an L-50 serial number prefix
- 1951 Hydra-Matic with an L-51 serial number prefix
- 1952 Hydra-Matic with an L-52 serial number prefix
- 1953 Hydra-Matic with an L-53 serial number prefix
- 1954 Hydra-Matic with an L-54 serial number prefix

==== 1950 – GM Type "A" Fluid ====
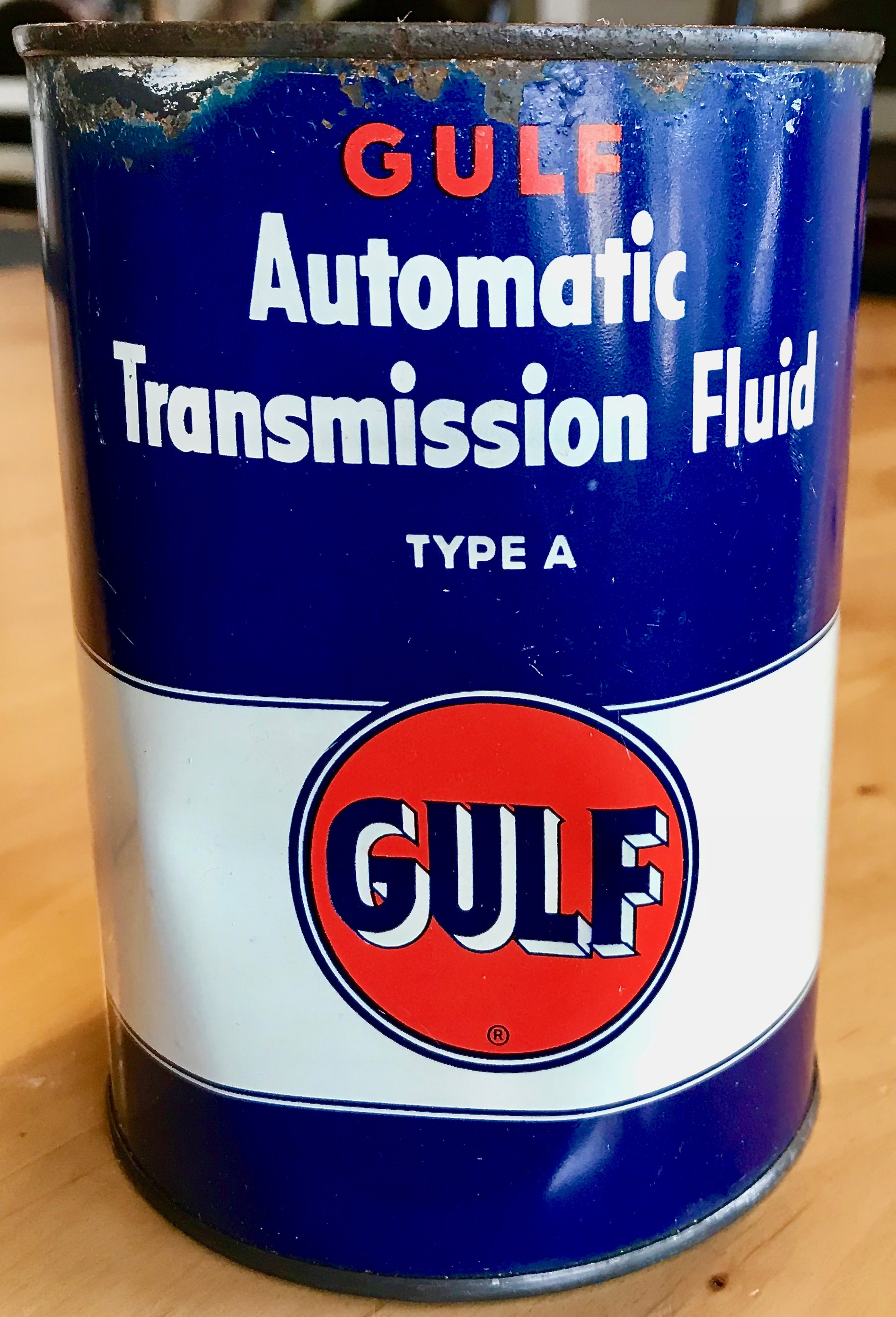
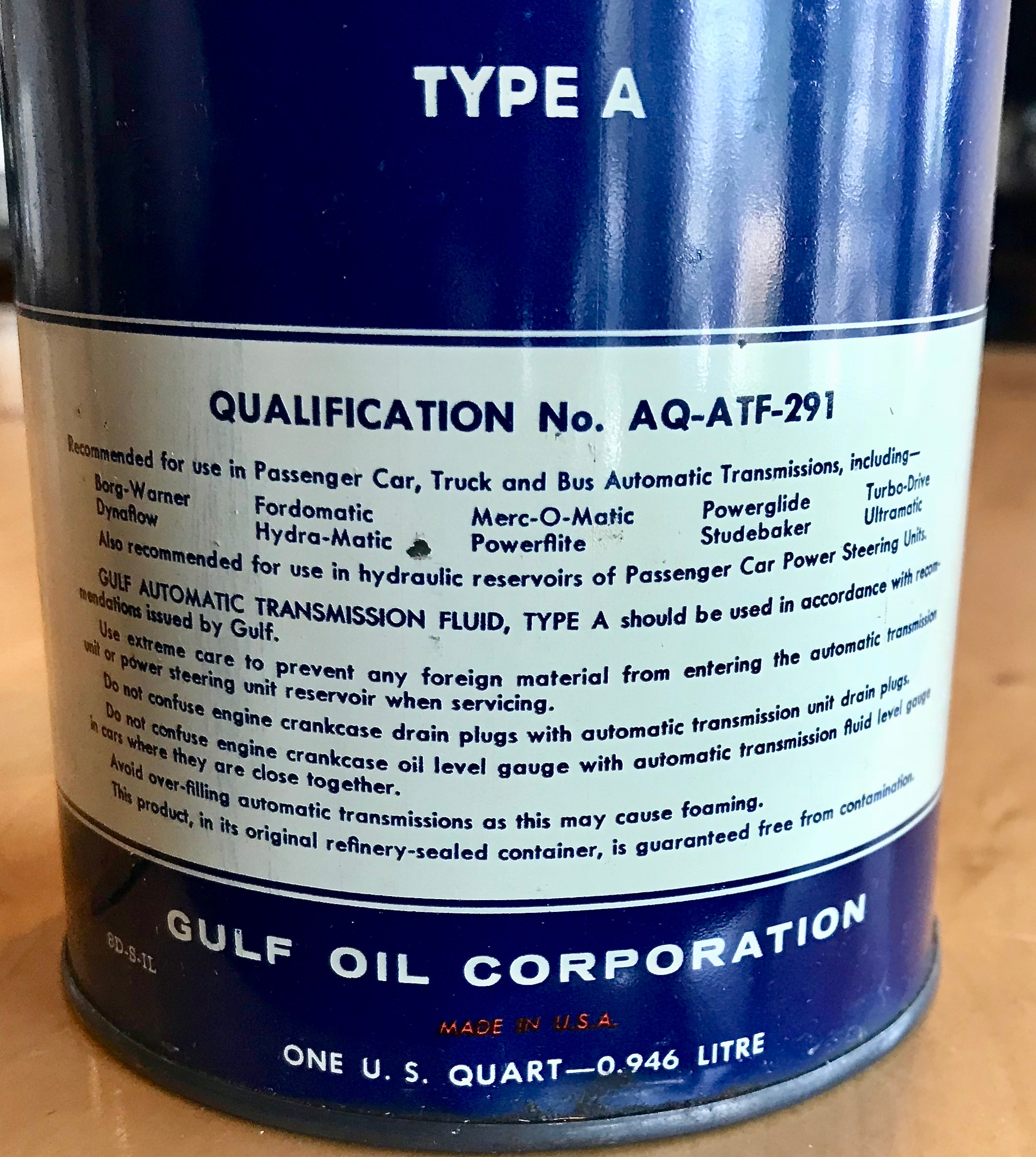
1955-1957 Gulf Type "A" ATF AQ-ATF-291

Every automatic transmission produced by any vehicle manufacturer (Oldsmobile, Cadillac, Buick, Chevrolet, Pontiac, GMC, Ford, Mercury, Lincoln, Chrysler, Dodge, Desoto, Packard, and Studebaker) used GM Type "A" transmission fluids in their transmissions from 1949 to 1958.

In 1950, 11 years after GM released the Hydra-Matic 4-speed automatic transmission and its special Hydra-Matic Automatic Transmission Fluid, Ford released their first fully automatic transmission; the 1951 Fordomatic 3-speed transmission. This new fully automatic transmission used the GM Type "A" automatic transmission fluid specification. Ford and hundreds of other resellers, became a licensed reseller of the GM Type "A" fluid with an Armour Qualification number. The Type "A" fluid was marketed under the Ford brand name. Under General Motors' Type A program, begun in 1949, qualifying fluids were tested with the help of the Armour Research Foundation of the Illinois Institute of Technology and were assigned an AQ (Armour Qualification) number that appeared on the container. By 1956 Type A fluid was recommended by every U.S. passenger car manufacturer, and V. G. Raviolo of Ford Motor Company called for "a higher V. I. than we have in today's Type A oil". Ford service manuals of 1953–1958 called for "Automatic Transmission Fluid, Type A" in the Fordomatic, Merc-O-Matic, Lincoln Turbo-Drive and Ford Transmatic Drive transmissions, and the 1956 Lincoln and Mercury and 1958 Continental and Lincoln manuals listed it as Ford part number 8L-19582.

This Fluid was First Used in the Following Transmissions:

- 1951 Fordomatic (Borg-Warner FX) 3-Speed automatic transmission
- 1954 Cruise O'Matic (Borg-Warner MX) 3-Speed automatic transmission
- 1955 Lincoln TurboDrive 3-Speed automatic transmission
- 1957 Ford Transmatic Drive 6-Speed Automatic Transmission for Medium-Duty and Heavy-Duty Trucks
- 1958 Cruise-O-Matic 3-Speed automatic transmission
- 1958 Edsel Mile-O-Matic 2-Speed automatic transmission
- 1958 Mercury Multi-Drive
- 1958 Lincoln TurboDrive 3-Speed automatic transmission

==== 1958 – Ford Type "A" Fluid ====
In 1959, Ford released their own Type-A automatic transmission fluid specification (M2C33-A) and stopped using GM fluid specifications for their in-house transmissions. The Ford M2C33-A fluid had GM Type "A" Suffix "A" characteristics. Transmission fluid service life was fairly short, and frequent transmission oil changes were required.

==== 1959 – Type "B" Fluid ====
In 1959, Ford released an updated automatic transmission fluid specification Type-B (M2C33-B). The Ford M2C33-B fluid had GM Type "A" Suffix "A" characteristics. As with the previous specification, transmission fluid service life was fairly short, and frequent transmission oil changes were required.

==== 1960 – Type "D" Fluid ====
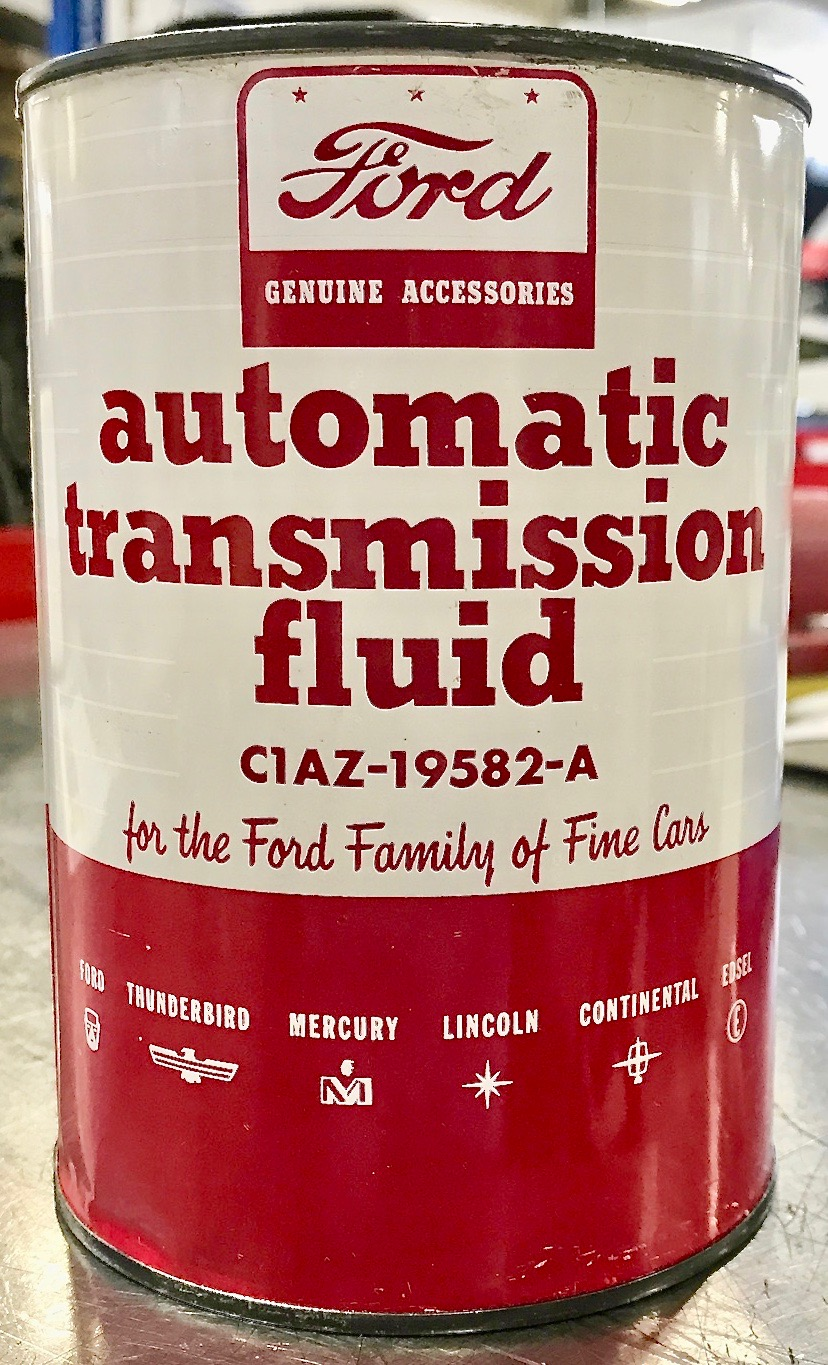
1960 Type D

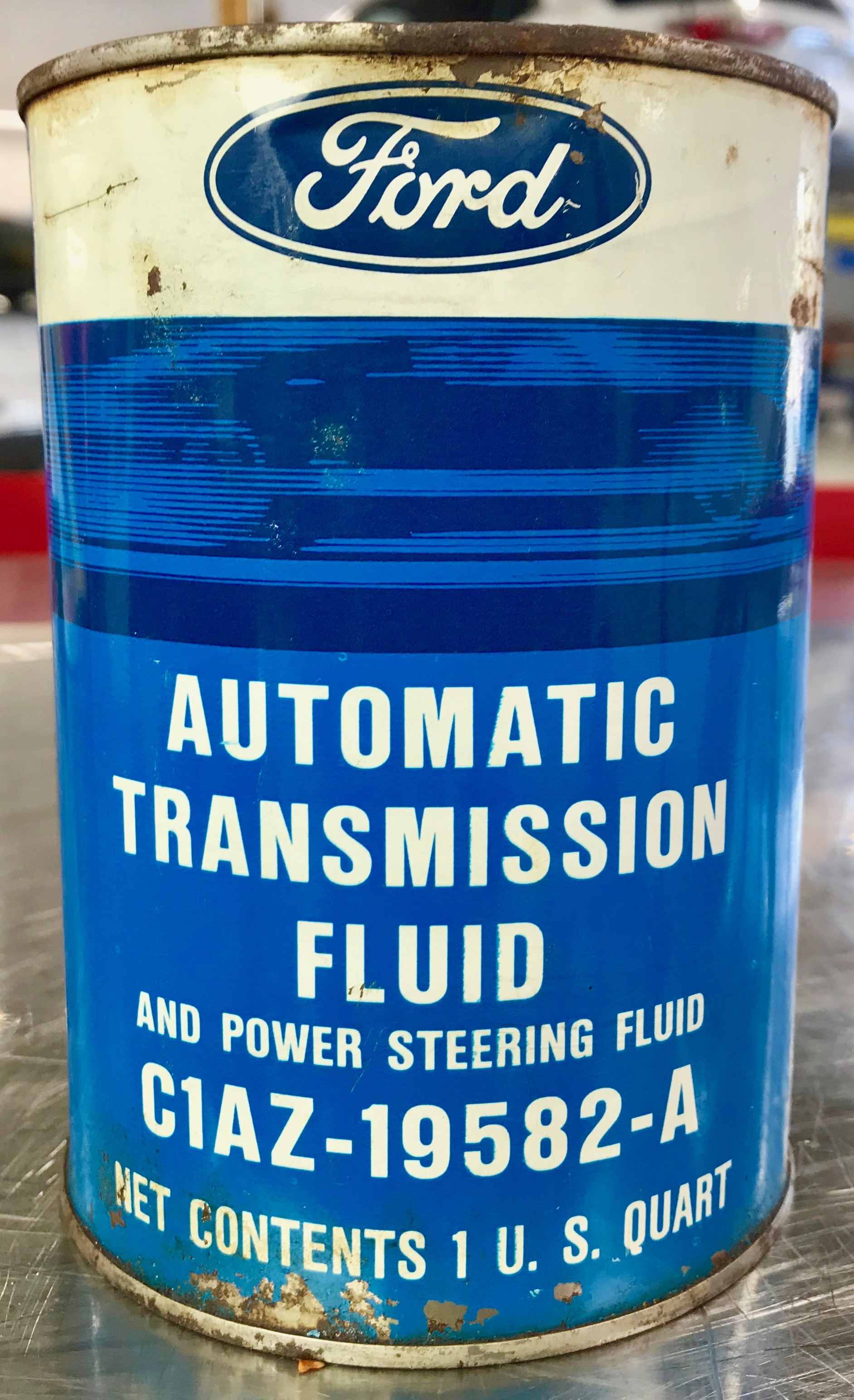
1967 Type F

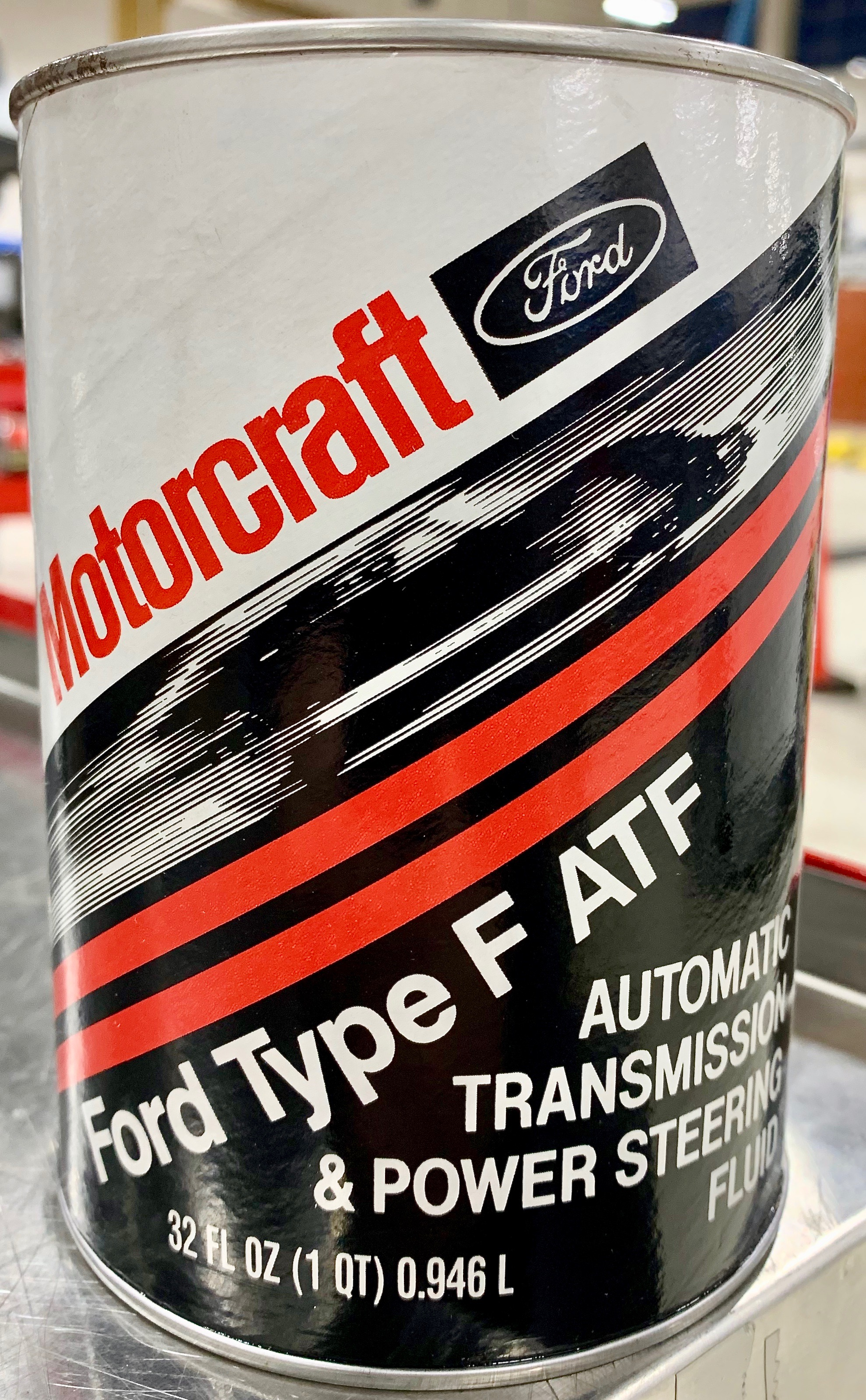
1981 Type F

1960 Ford Type D ATF; 1967 Ford Type F ATF, Ford License No. 2P-600110; 1981 Ford Type F ATF, Ford License No. 2P-800512.

In 1960, Ford introduced the Type-D (M2C33-D) specification for service fluid use in 1960 model-year vehicles. This fluid specification change provided better oxidation control, anti-wear performance, and higher static capacity capabilities were also included. Oxidation control of the fluid was measured by a new Merc-O-Matic oxidation test.

This fluid was first used in the following transmissions:

- 1964 C-4 3-Speed automatic transmission
- 1966 C-6 3-Speed automatic transmission
- 1968 FMX 3-Speed automatic transmission

==== 1967 – Type "F" Fluid ====
In 1967, Ford introduced a new fluid specification, the Type-F fluid (M2C33-F). This fluid provided a high static coefficient of friction which resulted in harsh shifting.

The Type-F fluid specification was intended to produce a “lifetime” fluid that would never need to be changed. This is the first of many Ford “lifetime” fluids. The 1974 Ford Car Shop Manual reads "The automatic transmission is filled at the factory with "lifetime" fluid. If it is necessary to add or replace fluid, use only fluids that meet Ford Specification M2C33F. A May 1990 Ford lubricant usage chart said to use Type F for automatic transmissions not listed in it and built before 1964.

==== 1972 – Type "G" Fluid ====
In 1972, Ford of Europe introduced a new fluid specification, the Type-G fluid (M2C33-G). This fluid was used through 1981.

This fluid was first used in the following transmissions:

- Borg-Warner M35 transmissions and variants

==== 1974 – Type "CJ" Fluid ====
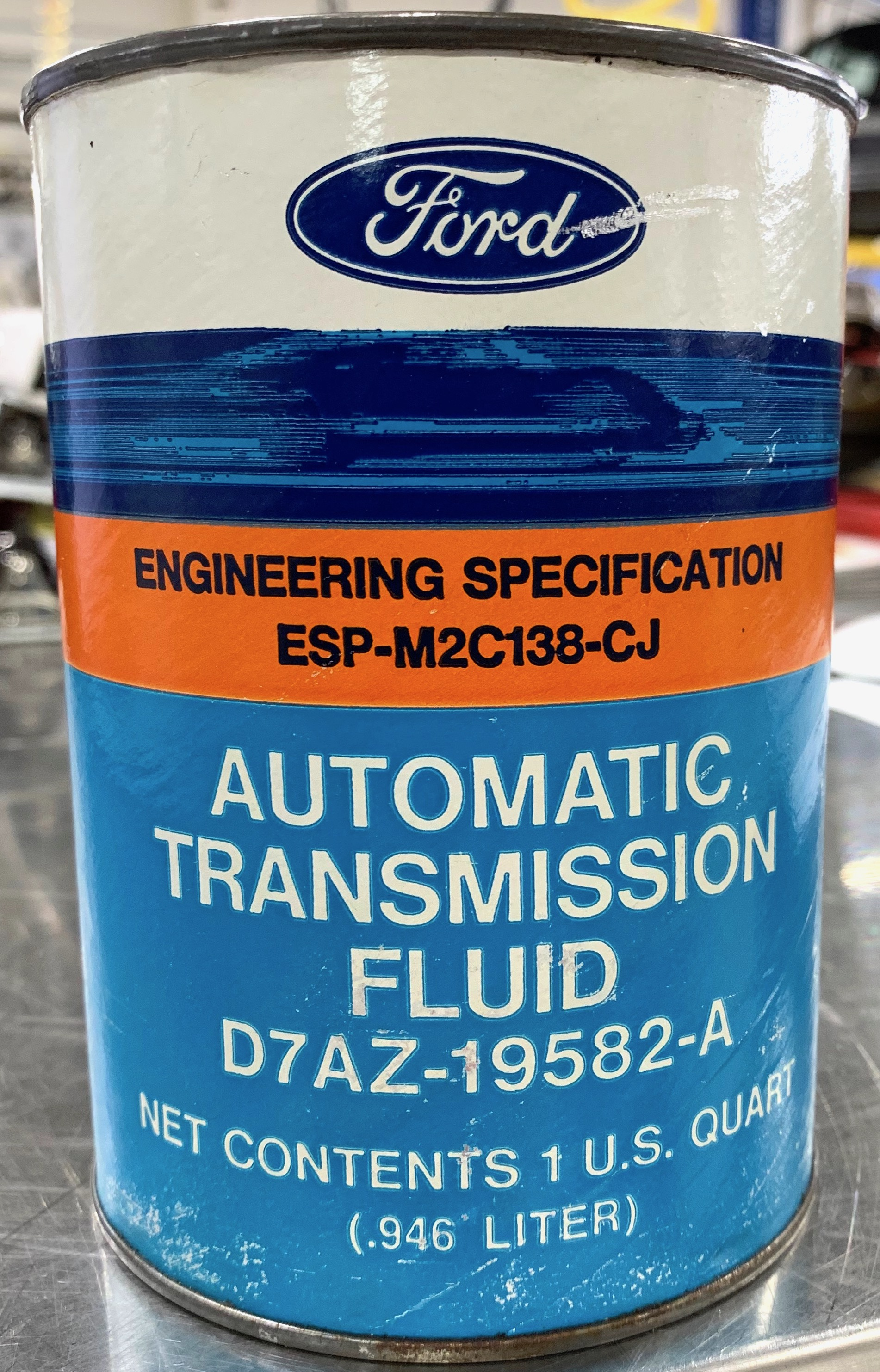
1977 Type CJ

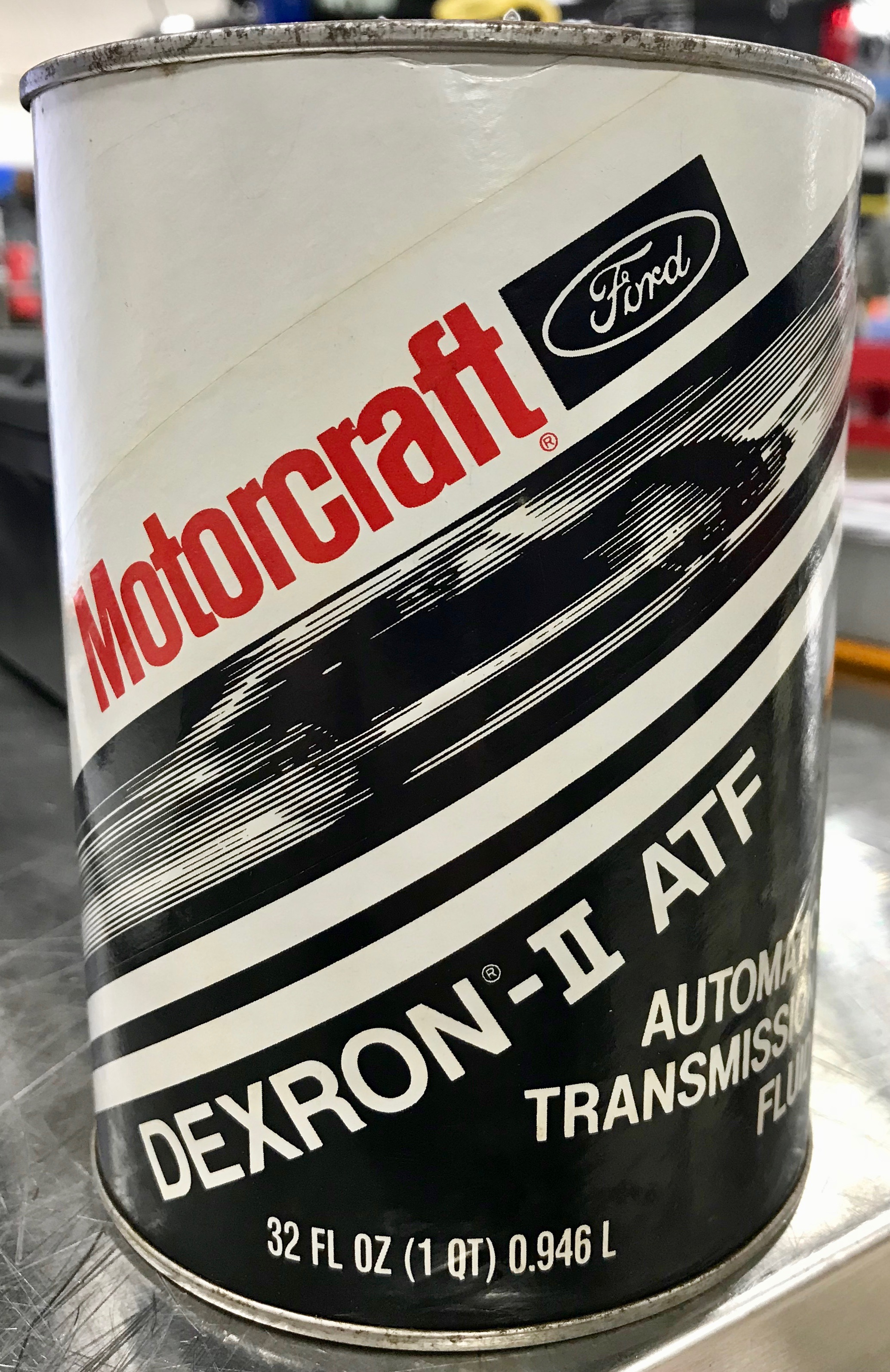
1981 multi-spec

1977 Ford Type CJ ATF; 1981 Ford Type CJ, Dexron-II(D), Dexron (B), Type "A" Suffix "A" Fluid (All Licensed).

In September 1974, Ford introduced a new fluid specification, the Type-CJ fluid (M2C138-CJ). This fluid provided smoother shifting and less gear noise by with higher dynamic friction characteristics. The Ford Type-CJ fluid specification also met the GM Dexron-II(D) and earlier fluid specifications. Ford was a licensed GM Dexron-II(D) vendor. For its 1977–1979 C6 transmissions, Ford recommended ESP-M2C138-CJ or Dexron II fluid.

The Ford Type-CJ fluid was compatible with GM Dexron II(D) specifications. This compatibility may suggest to some that all Ford, Mercon, and Dexron fluids are compatible; this is not correct. Always use the factory-recommended fluid for your transmission. (See the Aftermarket Automatic Transmission Fluids section below)

This fluid was first used in the following transmissions:

- 1974 C-3 3-Speed automatic transmission in the Pinto
- 1978 ATX 3-Speed automatic transmission
- 1980 ATX 3-Speed automatic transmission with a Centrifugally Linked Clutch (CLC) in the torque converter
- 1980 Jatco 3-Speed automatic transmission
- 1980 ATX 3-Speed automatic transmission with a Fluid Linked Clutch (FLC) in the torque converter
- 1980 AOD 4-Speed overdrive automatic transmission with torque converter bypass (Ford's first overdrive 4-speed)
- 1983 ZF-4HP33 4-Speed overdrive automatic transmission (Dexron-II(D))

==== 1981 – Type "H" Fluid ====
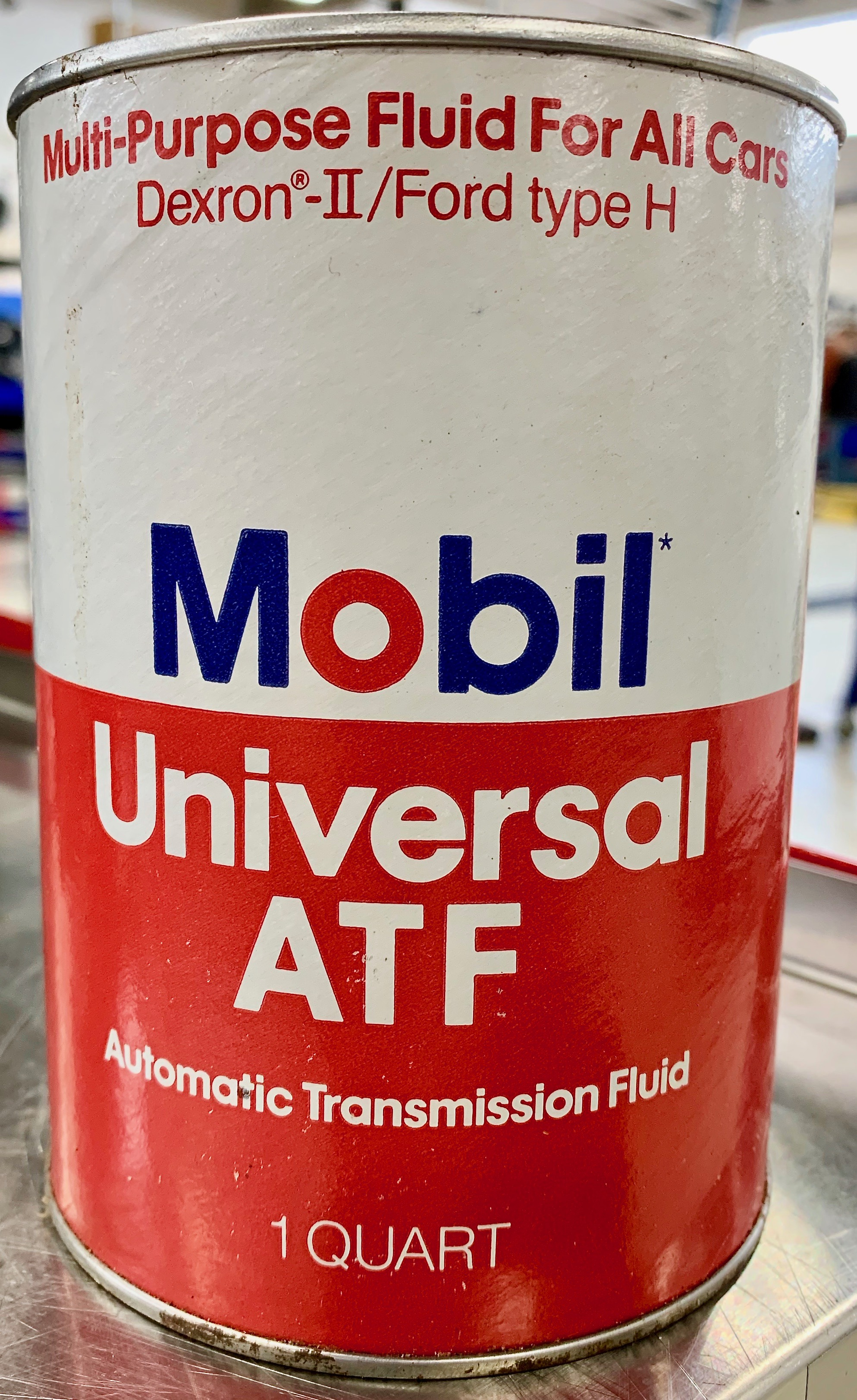
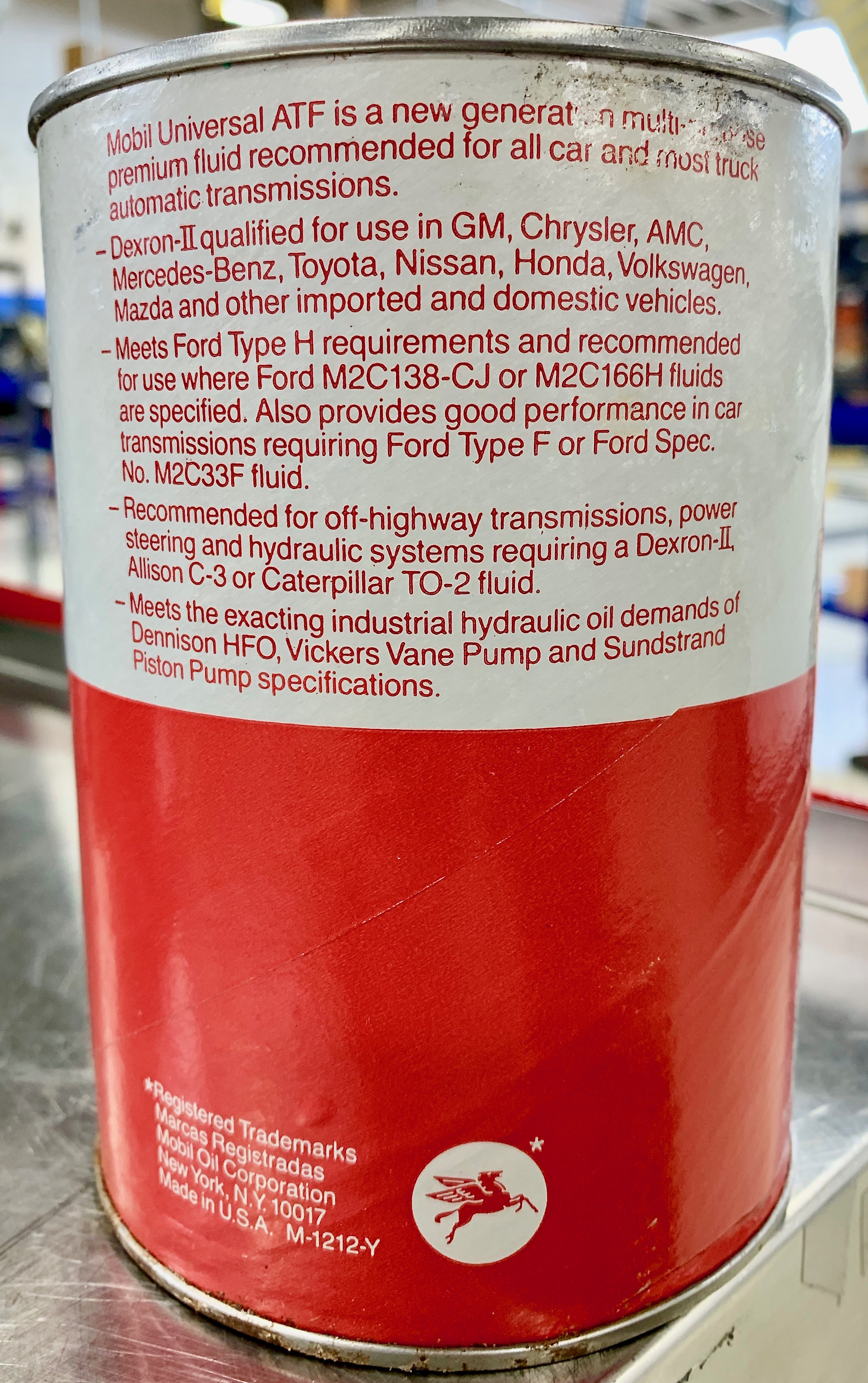
Mobil Universal Dexron-II(D) License No. D-21685 / Unlicensed Ford Type-H ATF

As a result of the 1973 OPEC Oil Embargo and fuel shortages, the U.S. government created the Corporate Average Fuel Economy (CAFE) regulations in 1975. The regulations were to be fully implemented by the 1978 model year. The automotive industry responded by changing to three typically unused transmission technologies:

1. A 4th gear (overdrive)
2. A Torque Converter Clutch (TCC)
3. Front Wheel Drive (FWD).

The introduction of the TCC led to customer complaints of a shudder while driving. All vehicle manufacturers made changes to their ATF specifications and the controls of their TCC to try and alleviate the problem. GM released the Dexron-II (D) fluid specification in 1978 and Chrysler released the ATF+2 fluid specification in 1980, and Ford released the Type-H fluid (M2C166-H) specification in June 1981.

The Type-H fluid specification provided improved friction characteristics in lock-up torque converters (reducing shudder during application and release). With this new specification, Ford introduced the aluminum beaker oxidation test (ABOT) to replace the older Merc-O-Matic oxidation test.

The Ford Type-H fluid was compatible with GM Dexron II(D) specifications. This compatibility may suggest to some that all Ford, Mercon, and Dexron fluids are compatible; this is not correct. Always use the factory-recommended fluid for your transmission. (See the Aftermarket Automatic Transmission Fluids section below)

Ford's 1987 technician training manuals said to "never add Type A or Type F where CJ or H is specified", permitting DEXRON II only in an emergency to fill to a safe driving level, and cautioned that using a fluid other than Motorcraft Type H (XT-4-H) in the AXOD transaxle "could result in transaxle malfunction and/or failure".

This fluid was first used in the following transmissions:

- 1982 C-5 (C4 with Torque converter Clutch (TCC)) 3-Speed automatic transmission
- 1985 A4LD (C3 with overdrive) 4-Speed automatic transmission
- 1986 AXOD 4-Speed automatic transaxle
- 1986 Electronic A4LD 4-Speed automatic transmission

=== MERCON Fluids: 1987 – Today ===
==== 1987 – MERCON ====
1987 Original Mercon ATF (2004 Bottle)
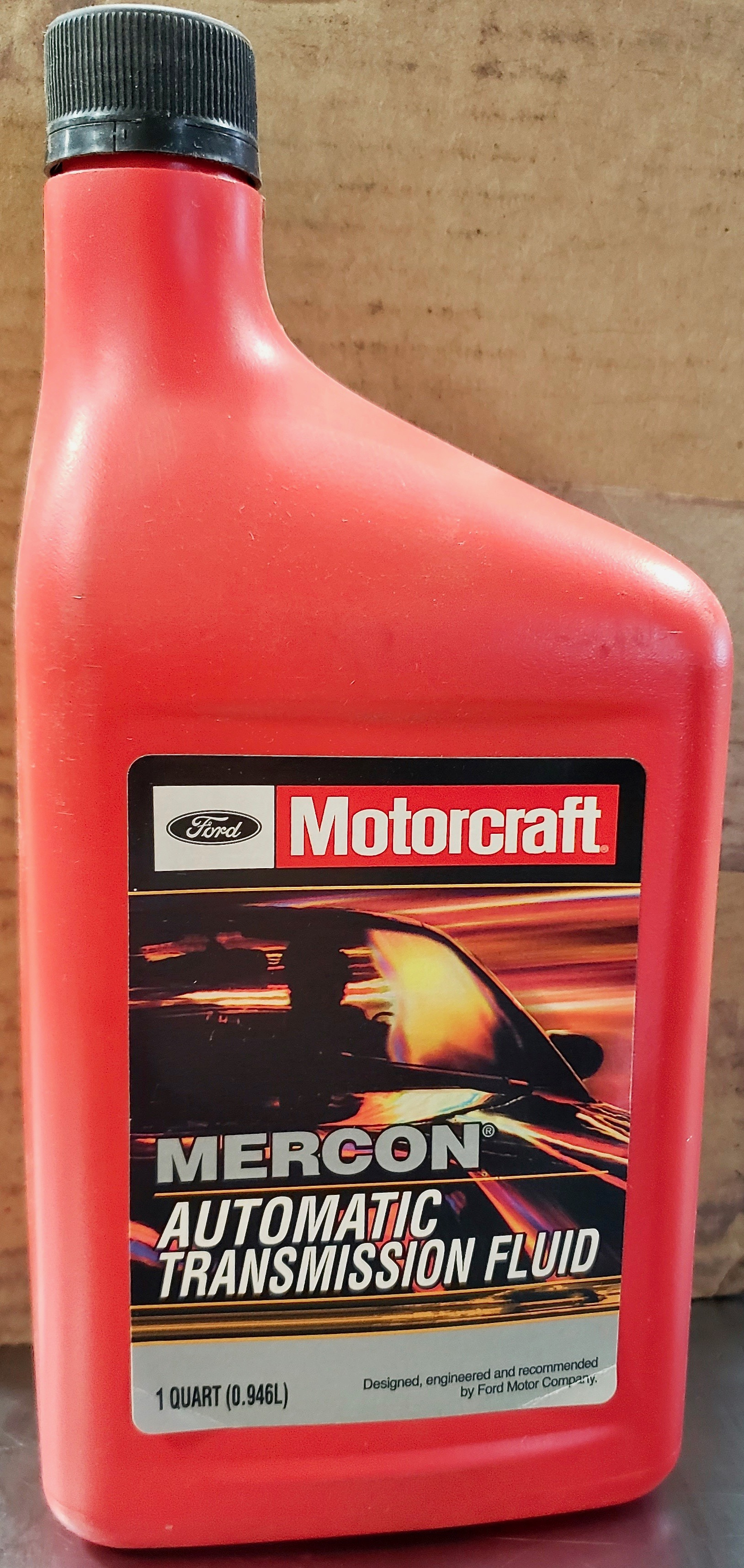
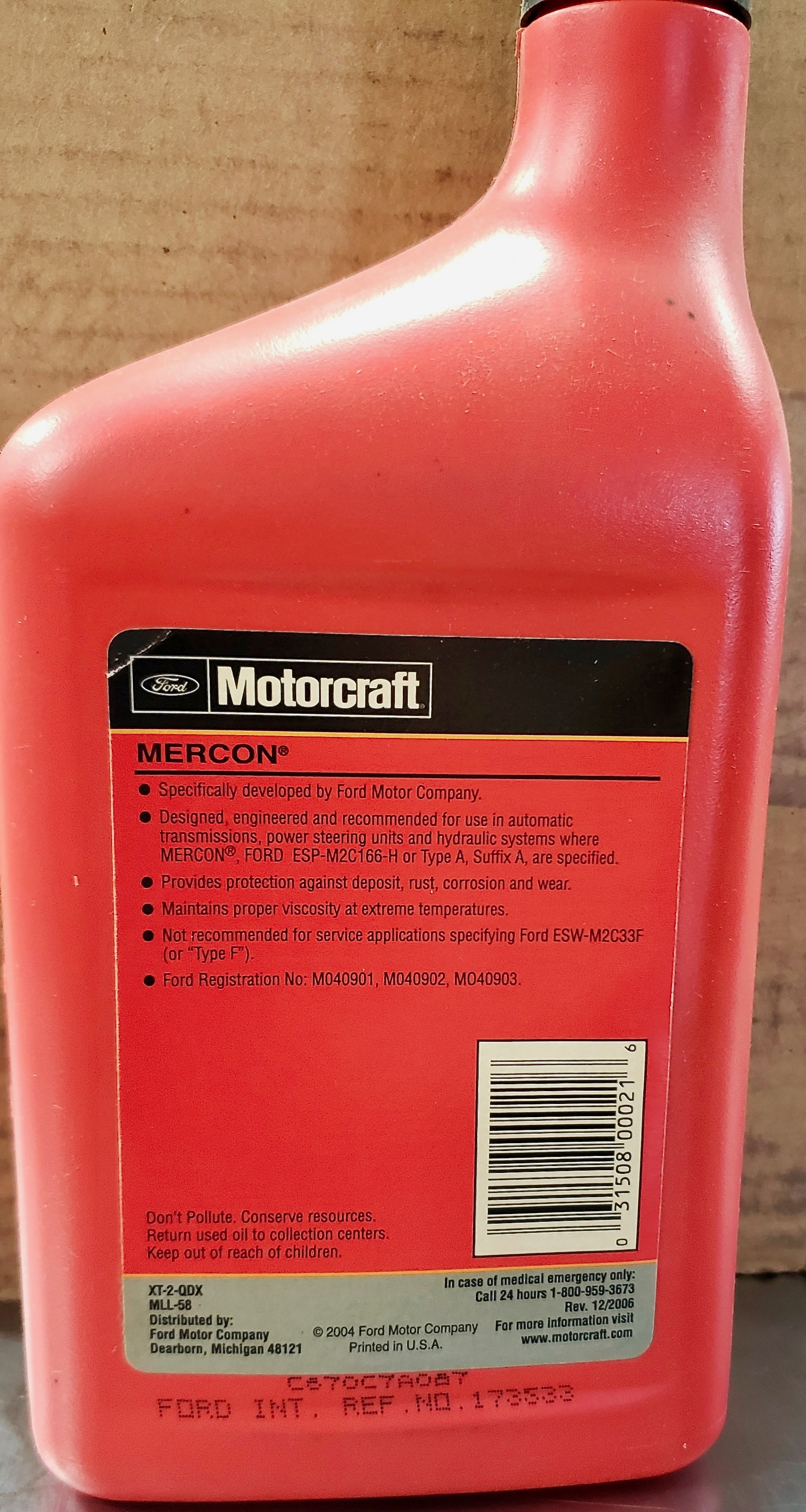
Original Ford Motorcraft Mercon ATF. License No. M040901

In January 1987, Ford released the original Mercon fluid specification (M2C185-A). Mercon became a trademarked fluid with the qualification and licensing of fluids to ensure quality in the marketplace. The aluminum beaker oxidation test (ABOT) has been the primary oxidation test in the Mercon specification since 1987. This original Mercon Specification was backward compatible with the 1981 Ford Type-H fluid and the 1958 GM Type "A" Suffix "A" fluid. Ford's May 1990 lubricant usage chart for 1964–1990 models listed Type F for the earlier years of transmissions such as the C4, C6 and FMX, and MERCON for later applications; where marked, existing DEXRON-II stock could still be used, but "new purchases for this application must be MERCON" (Motorcraft part numbers XT-2-QDX for quarts and XT-2-DDX for 55-gallon drums). Some fluids were licensed for both MERCON and GM's DEXRON-IIE; the label of Unilube Premium DEXRON-IIE & MERCON Transmission Fluid, sold by Coastal Unilube, Inc. of West Memphis, Arkansas, shows MERCON license number M920904 alongside DEXRON-IIE license number E25378, and recommends the fluid where DEXRON-IIE, MERCON, Ford M2C166-H (Type H) or Ford M2C138CJ (Type CJ) fluids are required.

NOTICE: This version of Mercon was compatible with GM's Dexron-II(D) and later formulations were compatible with Dexron-III(H); however, Future versions of Mercon (Mercon V, Mercon SP, Mercon LV, Mercon ULV) are not compatible with GM's Dexron-III(H) or any newer version of Dexron (Dexron-VI, Dexron HP, Dexron ULV).

Unilube Premium DEXRON-IIE & MERCON ATF bottle label. Mercon License No. M920904 and GM License No. E25378

This fluid was first used in the following transmissions:

- 1989 E4OD (C-6 with overdrive) Ford's first electronic control 4-speed automatic transmission
- 1990 4EAT-G Mazda 4-Speed automatic transmission
- 1990 F-4EAT 4-speed automatic transmission
- 1990 AXOD-E 4-speed automatic transaxle
- 1992 AOD-E (Electronic AOD) 4-speed automatic transmission
- 1993 AOD-EW/4R70W 4-speed automatic transmission
- 1994 AX4S 4-speed automatic transaxle
- 1994 CD4E Batavia 4-Speed automatic transmission
- 1995 AX4N/4F50N 4-Speed automatic transmission
- 1995 4R44E 4-speed automatic transmission
- 1995 4R55E 4-speed automatic transmission
- 1997 5R44 5-speed automatic transmission (Ford's first 5-speed automatic transmission)
- 1997 5R55 5-speed automatic transmission

==== 1996 – MERCON V ====
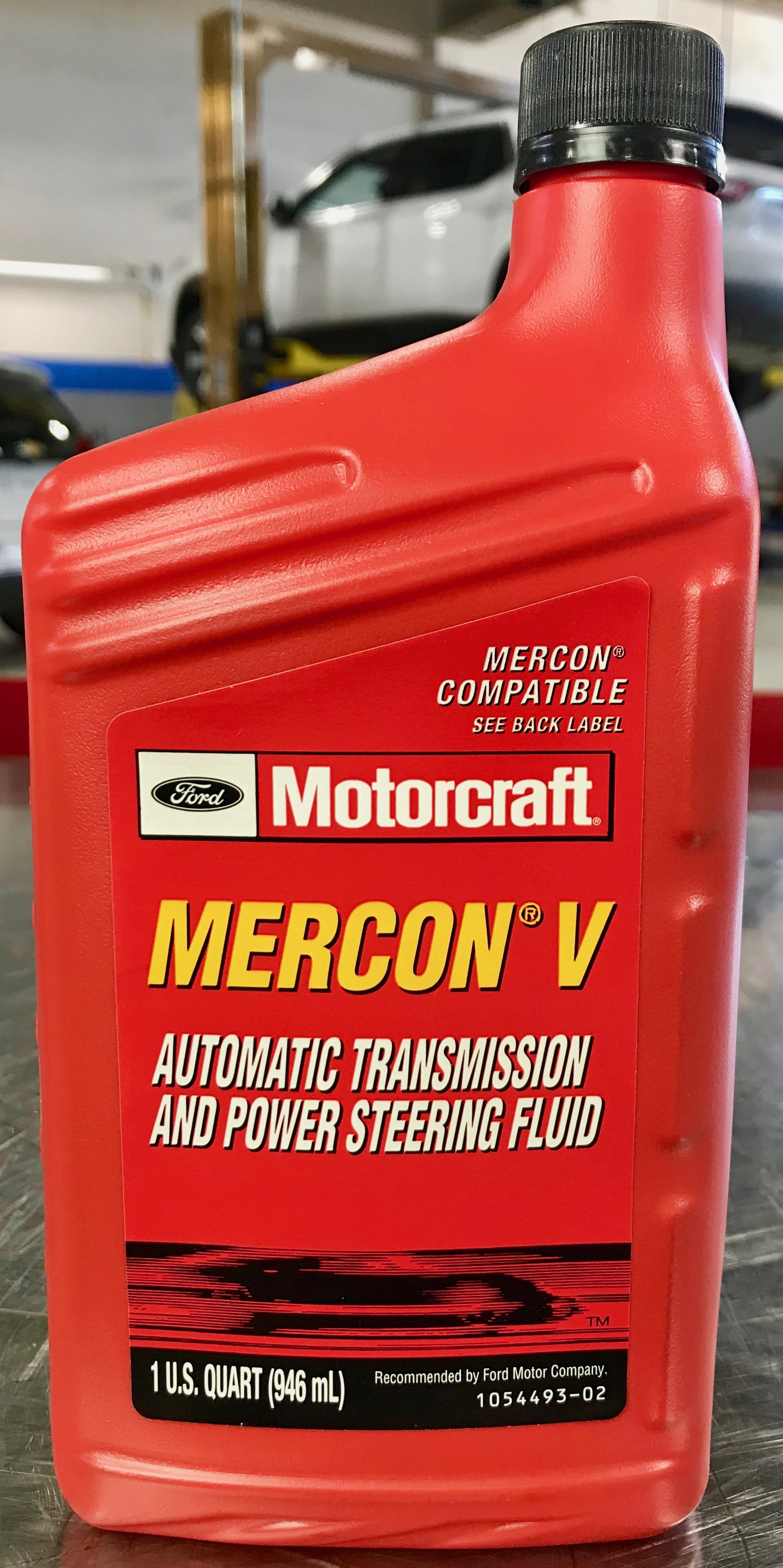
Mercon V

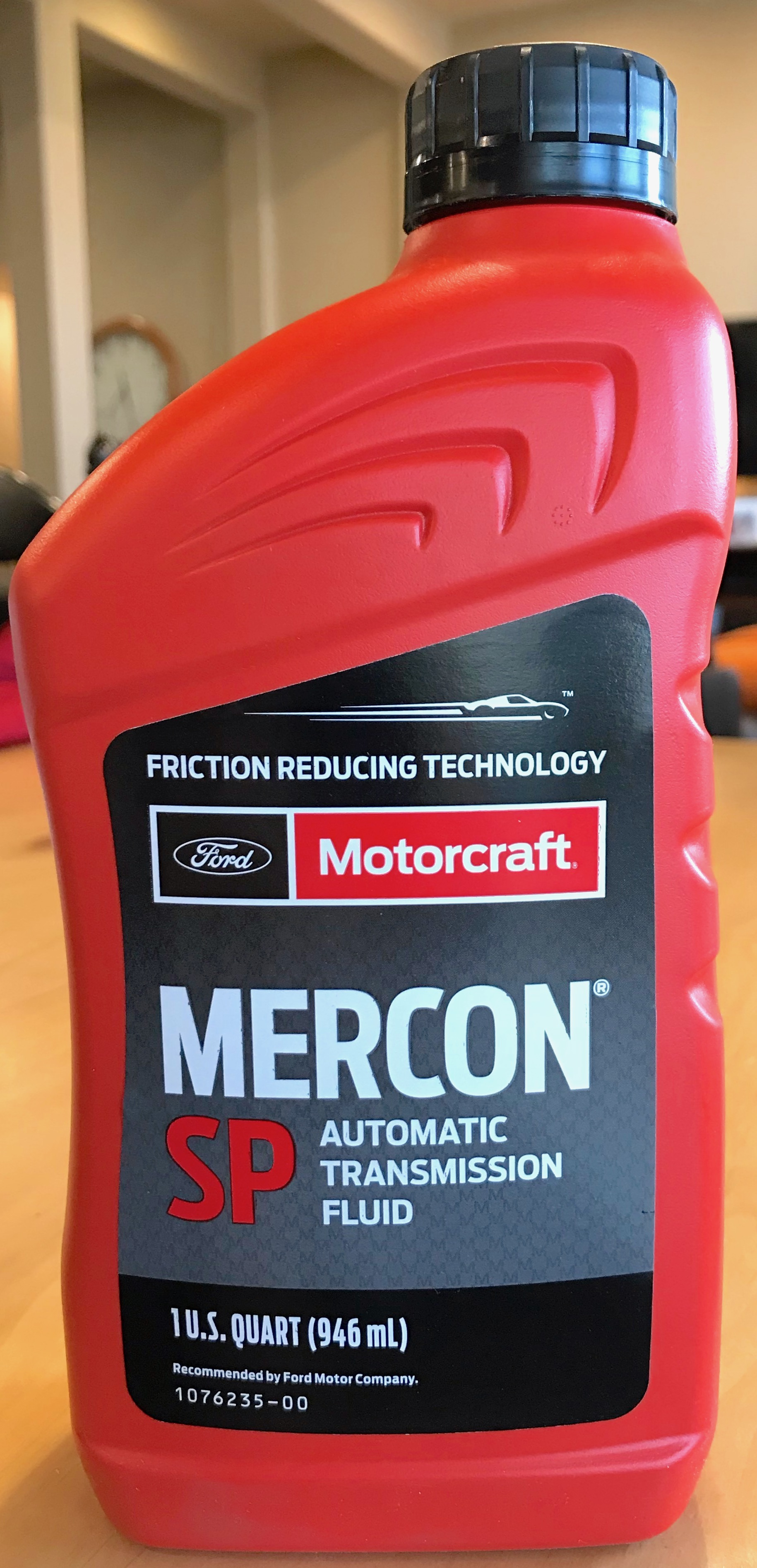
Mercon SP

Mercon V ATF, Mercon License No. M5091101; Mercon SP ATF, Mercon License No. MSP020201.

In 1996, Ford released the Mercon "V" fluid specification (M2C202-B). Ford Technical Service Bulletin (TSB) 06-14-04 indicates that Mercon "V" is to replace the original Mercon fluid. Starting with the 1998 model year, Ford required MERCON V in the Taurus and Sable, and in Windstars built from 9 September 1997, and stated that the two fluids were not interchangeable. In April 2006 Ford announced that no new MERCON licenses would be issued after 1 July 2006 and that existing licenses would expire by 30 June 2007; MERCON V became the service fluid for all applications that had specified MERCON.

This fluid was first used in the following transmissions:

- 1997 4R70W 4-speed automatic transmission
- 1998 4R100 4-speed automatic transmission
- 2000 4F27E 4-speed automatic transaxle

The Mercon "V" specification was revised in 2002 (M2C919-E). This revised fluid was first used in the following transmissions:

- 2003 4R75E 4-speed automatic transmission
- 2003 4R75W 4-speed automatic transmission
- 2003 5R110W 5-speed automatic transmission

==== 2001 – MERCON SP ====
In August 2001, Ford released the Mercon "SP" fluid specification (M2C919-D).

Ford SSM 21114 (November 26, 2009) indicates that Mercon Replace "SP" is to be replaced with Mercon LV on Torqshift transmissions from the 2003 through 2008 model years. This SSM does not apply to the ZF 6HP26 transmission.

This fluid first used in the following transmissions:

- 2001 5R110W Torque Shift 5-Speed automatic transmission
- 2005-2008 ZF 6HP26 6-Speed automatic transmission in Lincoln Navigator

==== 2005 – MERCON LV ====
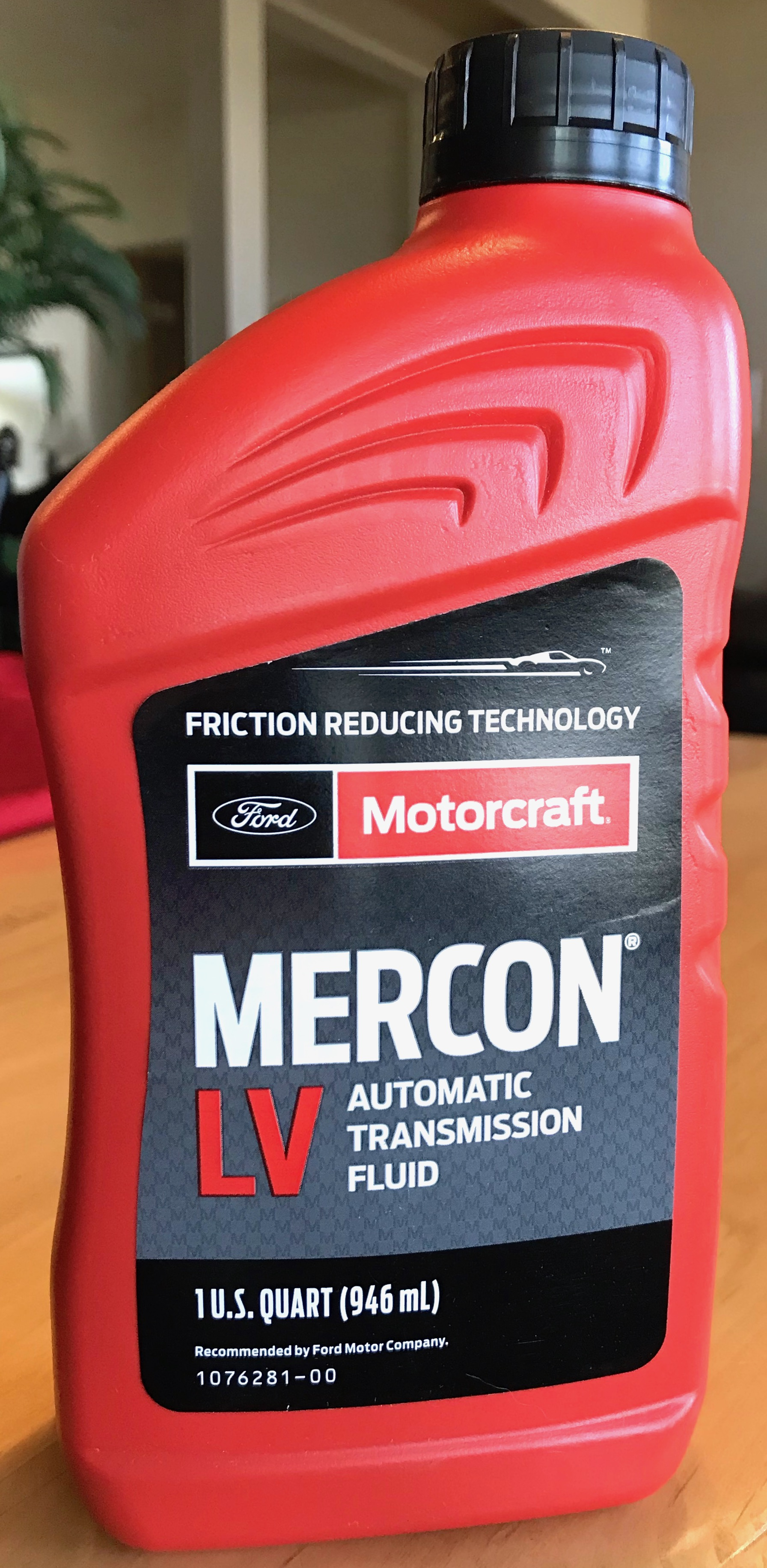
Mercon LV

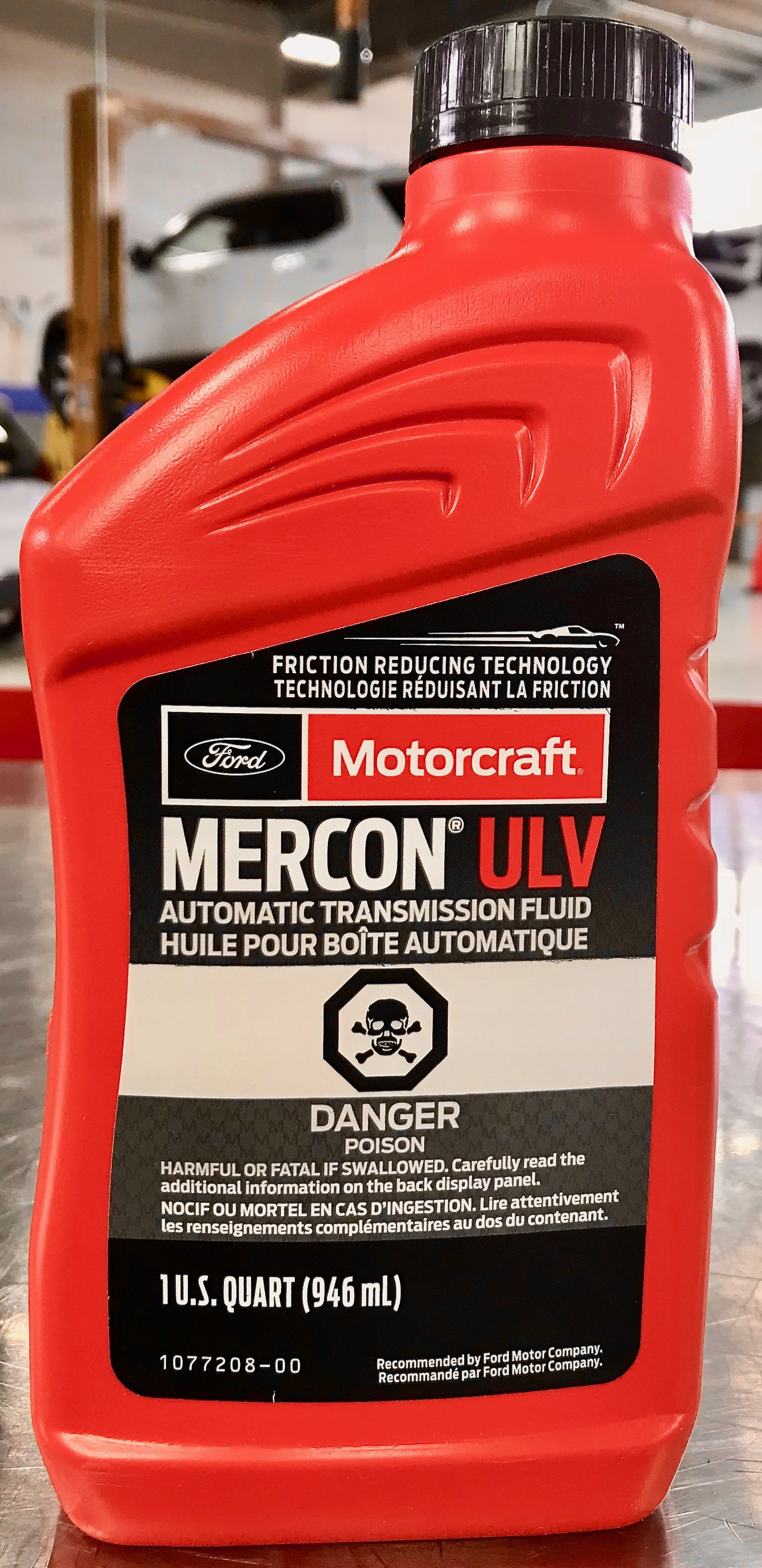
Mercon ULV

Mercon LV ATF, Mercon License No. MLV070701; Mercon ULV ATF, Mercon License No. MULV160703.

In December 2005, Ford released the Mercon "LV" (low viscosity) fluid specification (M2C938-A). Ford states that MERCON LV is not for use in transmissions that require MERCON V, because their viscosity specifications are not compatible.

This fluid was first used in the following transmissions:

- 2006 6R60 ZF 6-Speed automatic transmission
- 2006 FNR5 Mazda 5-Speed automatic transmission

This specification was revised in 2007 for use in the following transmissions:

- 2007 6F50 6-speed automatic transaxle
- 2007 6R80 6-speed automatic transmission
- 2009 6F35 6-speed automatic transaxle

This specification was revised again in 2010 (M2C938-A2) and was optimized for anti-Squawk performance of clutches. This revised fluid was first used in the following transmissions:

- 2011 6R140 6-speed automatic transmission
- 2013 HF-35 eCVT hybrid transaxle

==== 2014 – MERCON ULV ====
The fluid specification for Mercon-ULV (Ultra-Low Viscosity) was introduced on January 2, 2014. Mercon ULV is composed of a Group 3+ Base oil and additives needed for the proper operation of the 2017 and above Ford 10R80 and the GM 10L90 10-Speed rear wheel drive automatic transmission.

This transmission and the transmission fluid specification was co-developed by Ford and GM. The specification was released originally as a factory fill for the 9- and 10-speed automatic transmissions developed jointly by Ford and General Motors, and Ford states that MERCON ULV is not for use in applications specifying MERCON V, MERCON SP or MERCON LV. The current specification that defines the fluid is FORD WSS-M2C949-A. This fluid is also marketed as Dexron ULV.

NOTICE: The quart containers of Mercon ULV must be shaken to stir up the additives before pouring. This fluid is not backward compatible with any previous fluids.

This fluid was first used in the following transmissions:

- 2017 10R80 10-speed automatic transmission
- 2017 6F15 6-speed automatic transaxle
- 2017 6R100 6-speed automatic transmission

== Ford "Lifetime" ATF ==
The 1967 Ford Type-F fluid specification was designed to give automatic transmission fluid a longer service life, in line with Ford's "fill-for-life" policy of the 1960s. Ford's 1974 shop manual described the factory fill as "lifetime" fluid and required fluids meeting Ford Specification M2C33F. Other manufacturers have since extended their own fluid change intervals; GM's recommended interval rose from 25,000 miles for the original Dexron to 100,000 miles by 1989, and Toyota specifies inspection only, with no scheduled change, for its WS fluid.

=== Example Maintenance Schedule ===
Ford ATF Change Interval under "Normal Driving" Conditions*
Fluid Specification	Miles
1949 GM Hydra-Matic	5,000
1950 GM Type "A"	10,000
1959 Type "A"	15,000
1959 Type "B"	15,000
1960 Type "D"	15,000
1967 Type "F"	30,000
1972 Type "G"	30,000
1974 Type "CJ"	30,000
1981 Type "H"	30,000
1987 Mercon	30,000
1996 Mercon V	100,000
2001 Mercon-LV	150,000
2014 Mercon-ULV	150,000
*See your vehicle maintenance guide for definition of "Normal Driving" conditions and recommended service interval

Ford ATF Change Interval under "Severe Driving" or "Extreme Driving" Conditions*
Fluid Specification	Miles
1949 GM Hydra-Matic	2,500
1950 GM Type "A"	5,000
1959 Type "A"	7,500
1959 Type "B"	7,500
1960 Type "D"	7,500
1967 Type "F"	12,000
1972 Type "G"	12,000
1974 Type "CJ"	12,000
1981 Type "H"	12,000
1987 Mercon	12,000
1996 Mercon V	30,000
2001 Mercon-LV	30,000
2014 Mercon-ULV	30,000
*See your vehicle maintenance guide for definition of "Severe Driving" or "Extreme Driving" conditions and recommended service interval

Base Stock Oil Categories for Ford ATF based upon timeline of availability vs. fluid life under "Normal" driving
API BaseStock Oil	Miles
1949 Group 1	5,000
1950 Group 1	10,000
1959 Group 1	15,000
1959 Group 1	15,000
1960 Group 1	15,000
1967 Group 1*	30,000
1972 Group 1*	30,000
1974 Group 1*	30,000
1981 Group 1*	30,000
1987 Group 1*	30,000
1996 Group 2+	100,000
2001 Group 3	150,000
2014 Group 3+	150,000
*Hydrotreated Group 1

Lifetime automatic transmission fluids made from higher quality base oil and an additive package are more chemically stabile, less reactive, and do not experience oxidation as easily as lower quality fluids made from lower quality base oil and an additive package. Therefore, higher quality transmission fluids can last a long time in normal driving conditions (Typically 100,000 miles (160,000 km) or more).

The definition of 'Lifetime Fluid" differs from transmission manufacturer to transmission manufacturer. Always consult the vehicle maintenance guide for the proper service interval for the fluid in your transmission and your driving conditions.

2018 Ford F-150 Example: According to the Scheduled Maintenance Guide of a 2018 Ford F-150 with "Lifetime Fluid" could have three different fluid service intervals depending on how the vehicle is driven:

1. Normal Driving

- Normal commuting with highway driving
- No or moderate load or towing
- Flat to moderately hilly roads
- No extended idling

Under these driving conditions, the automatic transmission fluid needs to be serviced after every 150,000 miles (240,000 km).

2. Severe Driving

- Moderate to heavy load or towing
- Mountainous or off-road conditions
- Extended idling
- Extended hot or cold operation

Under these driving conditions, the automatic transmission fluid needs to be serviced after every 30,000 miles (48,000 km).

3. Extreme Driving

- Maximum load or towing
- Extreme hot or cold operation

Under these driving conditions, the automatic transmission fluid needs to be serviced also after every 30,000 miles.

== See also ==
- Dexron, ATF brand by GM
- Chrysler automatic transmission fluids
- Whale oil, an important constituent of ATF until 1974
