= DEXRON =

Trade name for a group of technical specifications for automatic transmission fluid

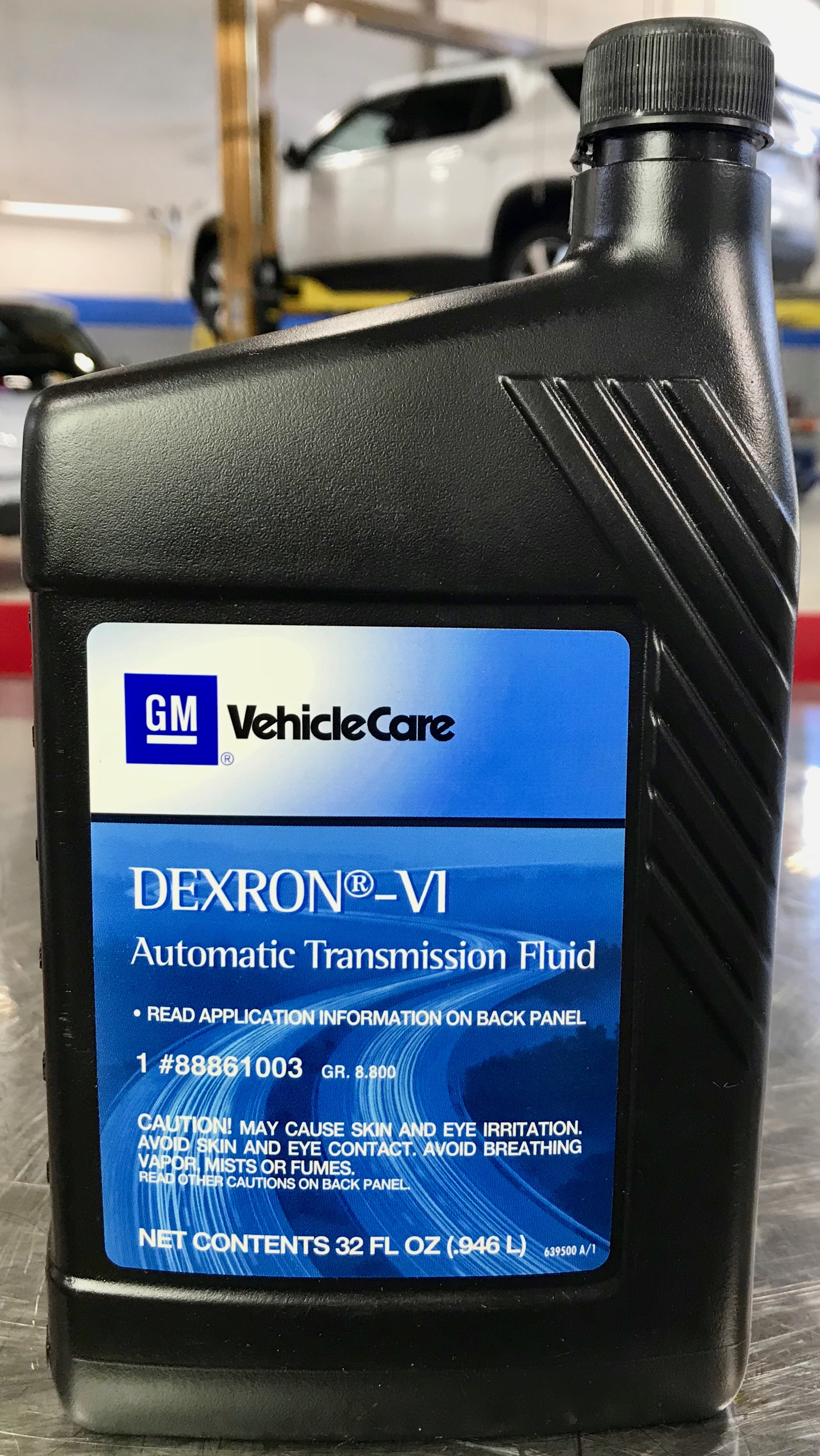
- 2006 GM DEXRON-VI(J) ATF
- Product type: Automatic transmission fluid gear oil
- Current owner: General Motors
- Country: U.S.
- Introduced: 1967; 59 years ago
- Related brands: Mopar (ATM); Mercon

DEXRON is the trade name for a group of technical specifications for automatic transmission fluid (ATF) created by General Motors (GM). The name was first registered as a trademark and later evolved into a brand of GM. GM licenses the name and specifications to companies that manufacture the fluid and sell it under their own brand names. Not all DEXRON fluids are licensed by GM for reselling under another brand name. Licensed products carry a GM license number on the container; DEXRON-II licenses used numbers beginning with D (for example D-21133), and DEXRON-VI licenses use numbers beginning with J (for example J-60001). GM has advised buyers to look for the DEXRON logo and the license number on the label. Like many automobile manufacturers, GM uses transmissions sourced from other suppliers or transmission manufacturers around the world; many of these may use their own unique fluid.

Originally, the DEXRON name was only associated with automatic transmission fluids, though GM later released DEXRON gear oils and other lubricants under the DEXRON brand.

== GM Automatic Transmission Fluids (ATF) ==
The original DEXRON (B) transmission fluid was introduced on April 1, 1967. Over the years, the original DEXRON (B) was supplanted by DEXRON-II (C), DEXRON-II (D), DEXRON-II (E), DEXRON-III (F), DEXRON-III (G), DEXRON-III (H), DEXRON-VI (J), DEXRON HP, DEXRON LV ATF HP, and DEXRON ULV, which is the latest fluid to date. GM has upgraded the DEXRON's specifications over time. The newer fluids are not always backward-compatible with previous fluids. Newer 6, 8, 9, and 10-speed transmissions, as well as plug-in hybrid (PHEV) and electric vehicle (EV) transmission technologies, require specialized fluids to operate properly. There remains a market for older fluids that claim to meet the earlier fluid specifications. See the details below for the backward compatibility of each fluid.

=== Before DEXRON: 1937–1967 ===
==== 1937 – Motor Oil ====
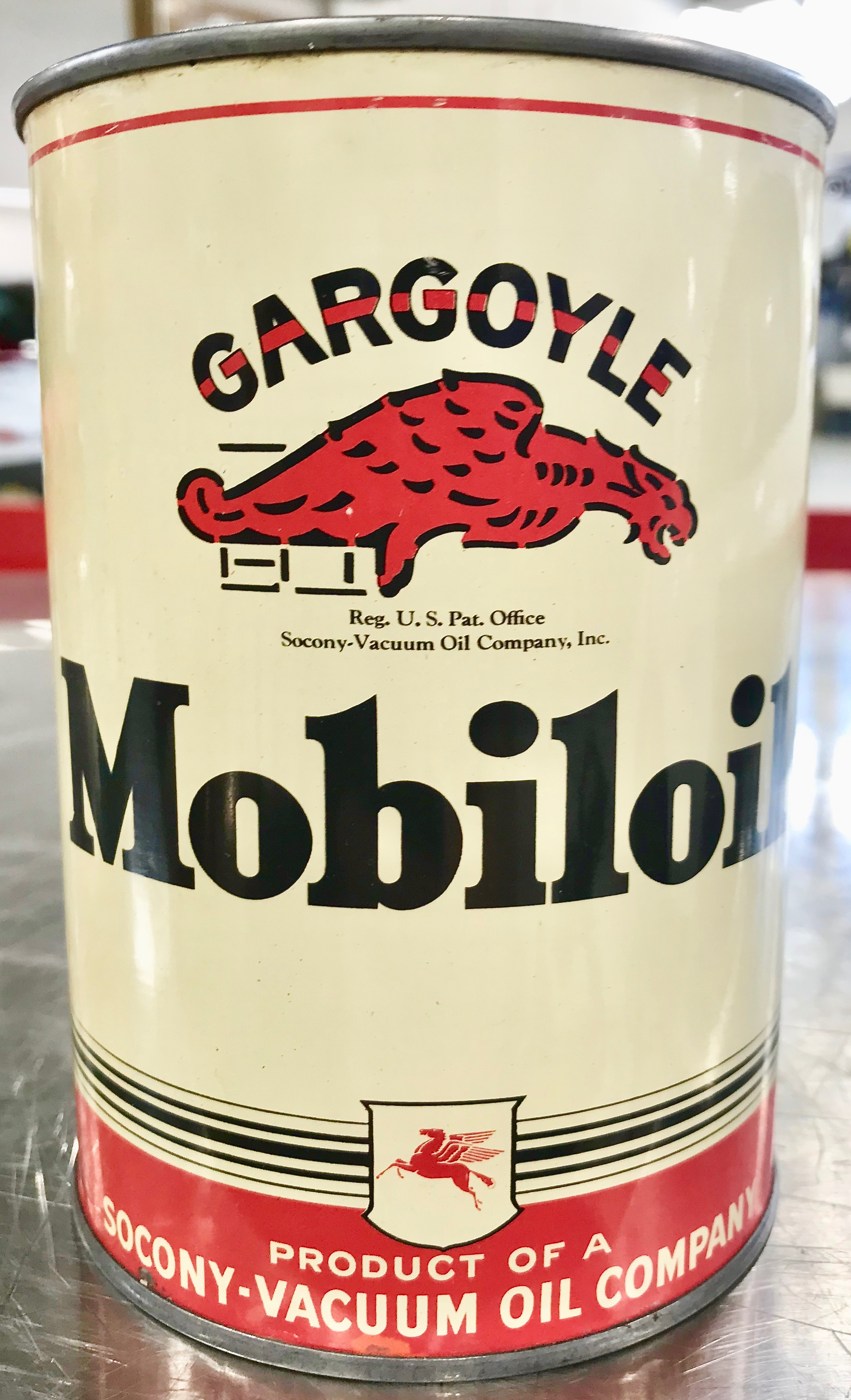
1937–1939 Mobiloil

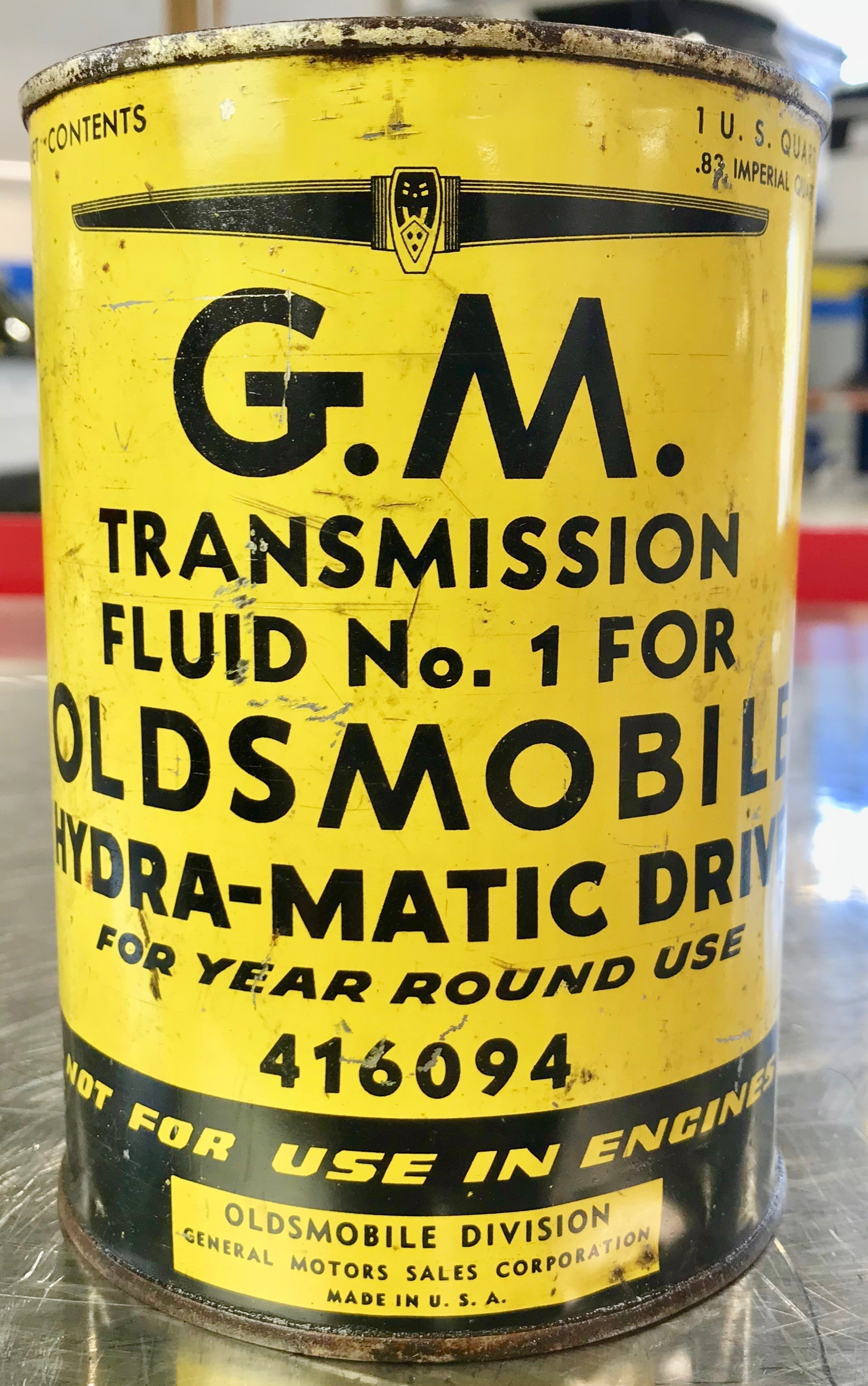
1940 Hydra-Matic fluid

1937–1939 Gargoyle Mobiloil, used in GM's Automatic Safety Transmission; 1940 GM Hydra-Matic automatic transmission fluid.

The automatic safety transmission was first offered as an extra-cost option by the Oldsmobile Division of GM in the fall of 1937 for their Six and Eight models. It was only used during the 1938 and 1939 model years. The automatic safety transmission used the same seasonal grade of motor oil as the engine for lubrication and hydraulic functions.

The Automatic Safety Transmission was a four-speed transmission that could shift powerfully without needing a regular clutch. The transmission was called the Automatic Safety Transmission (AST) because the clutch operation was reduced to one-third of that required by a conventional transmission. The clutch was only necessary when starting or stopping the car.

The AST had two driving ranges (low and high). In low range, the transmission would shift from 1st to 2nd gear and then hold in 2nd. In high range, the transmission would start in 1st gear, jump to 3rd, then shift to 4th gear. The driver could change ranges with a flick of a finger.

==== 1939 – Hydra-Matic Drive Fluid ====
Released in 1939, the 1940–1949 GM Hydra-Matic Drive was used by the Oldsmobile, Cadillac, and Pontiac divisions. The Hydra-Matic Drive used a specialized lubricant called GM Transmission Fluid No. 1. By using the term "fluid" rather than "oil," they hoped to discourage the previously accepted practice of using SAE 20 engine oil. This fluid was composed of a Group 1 base oil and additives to reduce oxidation, foaming, rust, corrosion, varnish, and sludge buildup. This was the world's first automatic transmission fluid, designed for the world's first mass-produced automatic transmission.

This fluid had cold-weather performance problems, which led to the need for an improved fluid, the Type "A" fluid, in 1949. The Hydra-Matic drive fluid was only available at GM dealerships. As a result, regular SAE 20 engine oil was being used in its place at filling stations and repair garages. Engine oil was only approved as a temporary fill fluid and led to transmission problems.

==== 1949 – Type "A" Fluid ====
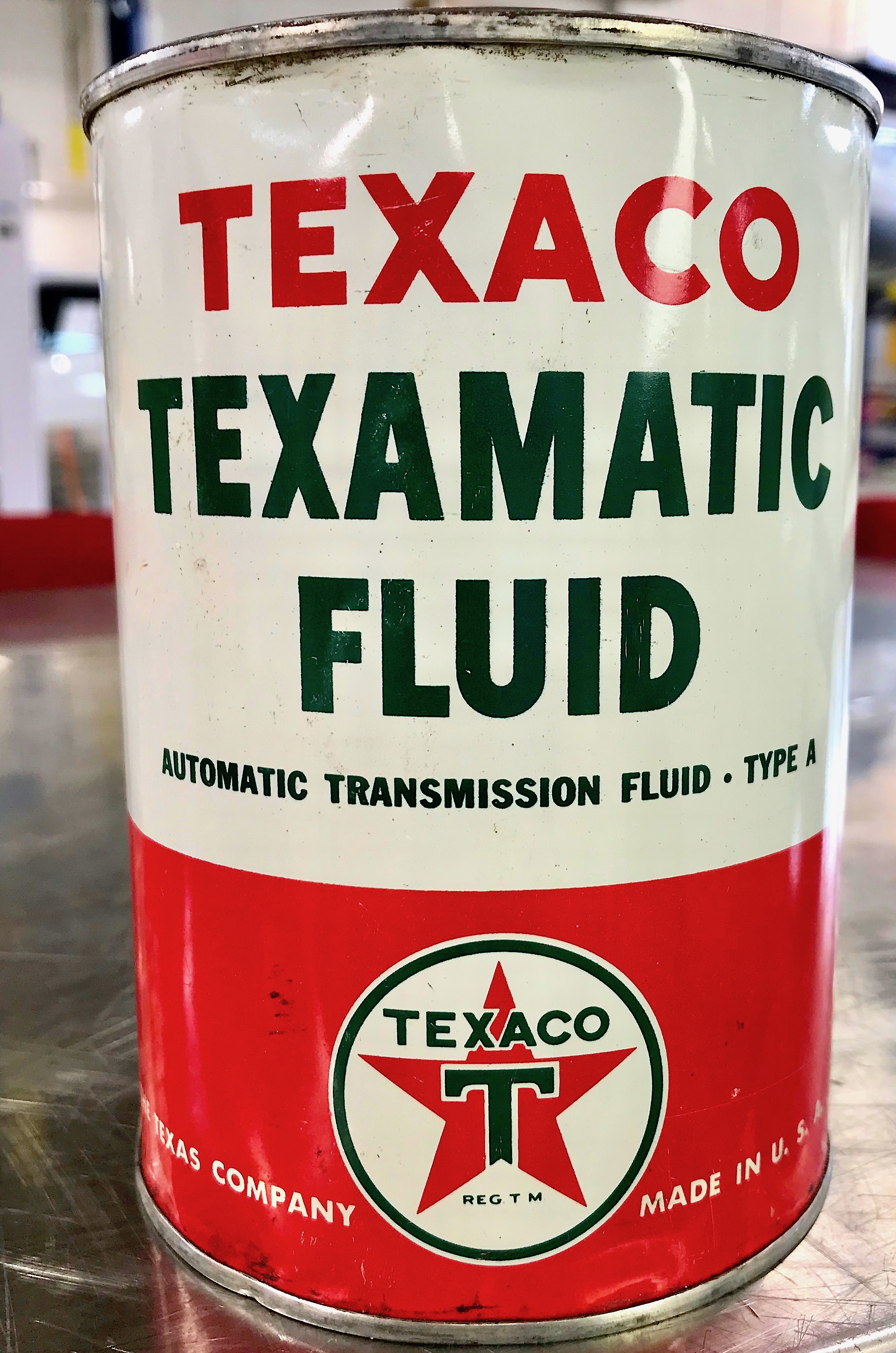
1949 Texaco Texamatic Type "A" Fluid. GM License No. AQ-ATF-102

In 1949, General Motors (GM) established an Automatic Transmission Fluid (ATF) Committee (GM ATF Committee). The GM ATF committee established fluid specifications and a qualification procedure to eliminate unsatisfactory fluids and, at the same time, provide the car owner with a means of identifying qualified fluids. The GM ATF Committee released a new Type "A" fluid specification. GM partnered with the Armour Research Foundation for fluid and qualification testing. Fluids that met the GM qualification requirements were issued an Armour Qualification (AQ) license number of AQ-ATF-xxx. Example (AQ-ATF-101). The license number had to be displayed on the fluid container. A 1968 review in Texaco's Lubrication states that the Armour Research Foundation, part of the Illinois Institute of Technology, was engaged to assist in qualifying fluids, and that the AQ (Armour Qualification) number appeared on the container as a customer assurance of product quality. The two fluids then in use were assigned AQ-ATF-101 and AQ-ATF-102 in 1949, and about 100 other marketers bought and rebranded them during the first two years of the program. The last number granted in 1955 was AQ-ATF-482, and a list of qualified fluids published on 30 September 1955 named 229 marketers. The number was embossed on the lids of sealed 1-quart and 5-quart containers and stenciled on 5-, 30- and 55-gallon containers, and any change in formulation, source of supply or brand name required a new number. Late-1950s GM division service manuals, such as Chevrolet's 1957 Passenger Car Shop Manual, Buick's 1958 Flight Pitch Dynaflow manual and Pontiac's 1959 Hydra-Matic manual, told mechanics to use Type A fluid identified by an "AQ-ATF" number on the container.

As a result, qualified GM automatic transmission fluid was made available at retailers and service garages in many places.

From 1949 to 1951, there were only two licensed fluids:

1. GM Type "A" Automatic Transmission Fluid License No. AQ-ATF-101
2. Texaco Texamatic Fluid Type "A" License No. AQ-ATF-102

This was the first GM automatic transmission fluid that was made available for sale at retailers other than GM dealerships. In 1951, GM began licensing more Type "A" fluids, which led to several hundred brands of licensed Type "A" fluid on the market. This fluid is backward compatible with the Hydra-Matic Drive fluid produced from 1940 to 1949.

It is important to understand that every automatic transmission produced by any vehicle manufacturer (Oldsmobile, Cadillac, Buick, Chevrolet, Pontiac, GMC, Ford, Mercury, Lincoln, Chrysler, Dodge, Desoto, Packard, and Studebaker) used motor oil or the GM Type "A" transmission fluids from 1949 to 1958.

In 1950, Ford released their 1951 Fordomatic 3-speed transmission, which used the GM Type "A" fluid. Ford's 1953 shop manual supplement told mechanics to fill the Fordomatic with "Automatic Transmission Fluid, Type 'A'". In 1952, Chrysler released their 1953 Powerflite 2-speed transmission, which also used GM Type "A" fluid.

This fluid was first used in the following transmissions:

- 1948 Buick Dynaflow 2-Speed Semi-Automatic Transmission
- 1950 Chevrolet Cast Iron Powerglide 2-Speed Semi-Automatic Transmission
- 1953 GM Dual Range Hydra-Matic 4-Speed Automatic Transmission
- 1953 Chevrolet Powerglide 2-Speed Automatic Transmission
- 1953 Buick Dynaflow 2-Speed Automatic Transmission
- 1956 Buick Dynaflow 2-Speed Automatic Transmission
- 1956 GM Controlled Coupling Hydra-Matic 4-Speed Automatic Transmission
- 1957 Chevrolet Turboglide 3-Ratio Automatic Transmission
- 1957 Buick Flightpitch Dynaflow 3-Ratio Automatic Transmission

==== 1957 – Type "A" Suffix "A" Fluid ====
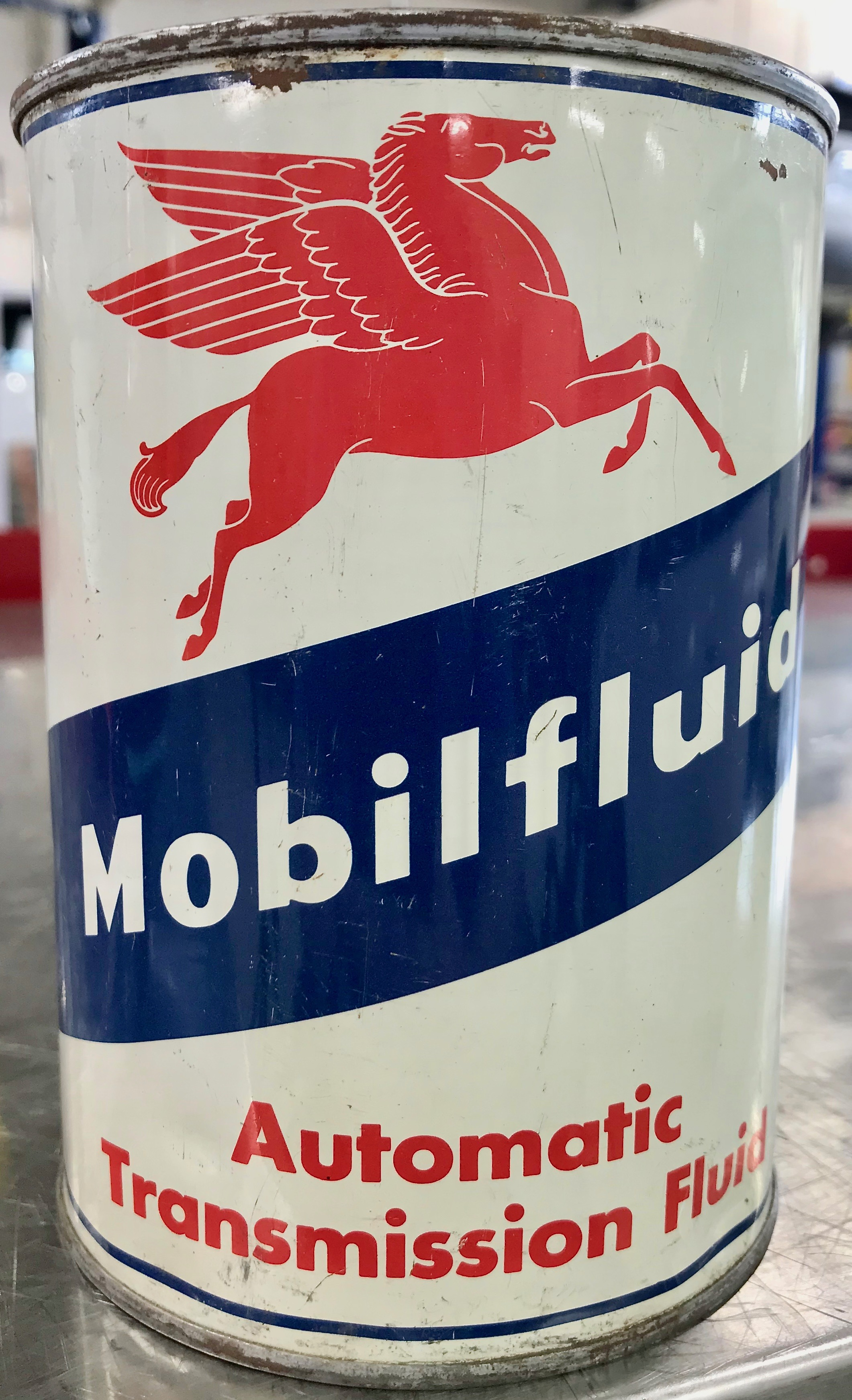
1963–1966 GM Licensed Mobilfluid ATF Type "A" Suffix "A" GM License No. AQ-ATF-752A

In 1957, GM released a new Type "A" Suffix "A" fluid specification. This fluid was better suited for the higher fluid temperatures caused by the unique torque converters and higher power engines of the day. The fluid specification was revised again in 1958, 1959, and 1960.

GM continued the licensing program, allowing oil companies to produce the new Type "A" suffix "A" fluid under their own brand name. GM-licensed fluids had the Armour Qualification license number of AQ-ATF-xxxA. Example (AQ-ATF-752A) stamped on the can This fluid is backward compatible with the Type "A" and Hydra-Matic Drive fluids produced from 1940 to 1957. The Suffix A specification remained in effect until early 1967. Over the 18 years of the Type A program, 179 original formulations were qualified and about 3,000 numbers were assigned for use with the AQ-ATF mark. Armour Research Foundation was the first of the independent test laboratories; in the later years AutoResearch Laboratories, Inc. and Southwest Research Institute ran the qualification tests.

In 1959, Ford released its own automatic transmission fluid specification (M2C33-A) and stopped using GM fluid specifications. Also in 1959, Toyota released their Toyoglide 2-speed transmission, which used the GM Type "A" suffix "A" fluid.

This fluid was first used in the following transmissions:

- 1961 GM Roto-Hydra-Matic 3-Speed Automatic Transmission
- 1961 Buick Dual Path 2-Speed Automatic Transmission
- 1961 Mercedes-Benz K4A 025 4-Speed Automatic Transmission
- 1962 Chevrolet Aluminum Powerglide 2-Speed Automatic Transmission
- 1964 GM Hydra-Matic 400 3-Speed Automatic Transmission
- 1966 GM Hydra-Matic 425 3-Speed Automatic Transmission

=== DEXRON fluids ===
==== 1967 – DEXRON (B) ====
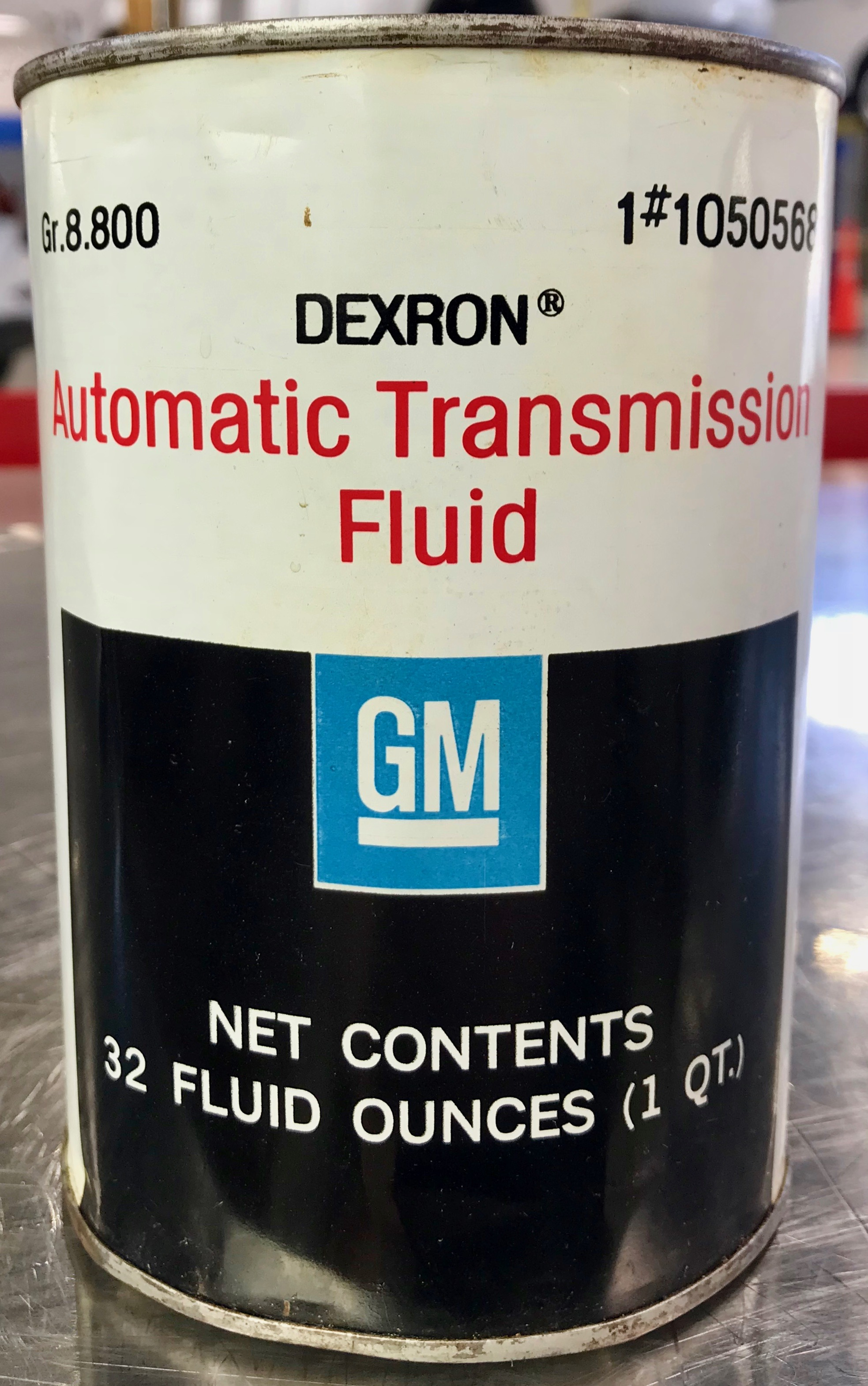
1967 GM Dexron (B) ATF. GM License No. B-10001

DEXRON (B) was released on April 1, 1967. The original fluid better retained the initial properties of the previous Type "A" Suffix "A" fluid (Several thousand cycles compared to 1000 cycles). DEXRON (B) was composed of a more stable, less reactive, hydrotreated Group 1 base oil plus additives to help prevent foaming, oxidation, and damage from elevated temperatures. This was the first GM ATF to advertise 24,000 miles between changes.

This was the first GM ATF to require red dye as an aid in fluid leak detection. Prior to this fluid, GM ATF was the same color as engine oil. Aftermarket ATF was available with red dye.

GM DEXRON (B)-licensed products have a license number on the container that begins with the letter B. Example: B10001. Unlike the AQ-ATF numbers, DEXRON licenses were issued directly by General Motors, and each licensed fluid received an identification number made up of a capital B, a dash and five digits (for example, B-10100). This fluid is backward compatible with all Type "A" suffixes and the Type "A" fluids produced from 1949 to 1966.

This fluid was first used in the following transmissions:

- 1969 GM Hydra-Matic 180 3-Speed Automatic Transmission

==== 1973 – DEXRON-II(C) ====
The original DEXRON (B) fluid, as well as earlier GM transmission fluids, used sperm whale oil as an additive to coat internal transmission parts to prevent corrosion and rust. The U.S. Endangered Species Act banned the import of sperm whale oil, so the DEXRON (B) fluid additive package had to be reformulated. In 1973, GM introduced DEXRON-II(C) (GM Spec GM6032M).

DEXRON-II(C) used a revised additive package with corrosion and rust inhibitors such as jojoba oil; however, the additive package caused problems with corrosion-prone solder in a relatively small number of GM's transmission fluid coolers. When DEXRON-II was introduced in the early 1970s, its fluids could be readily formulated with conventional solvent-refined Group I base stocks, because the specification's low-temperature (Brookfield) viscosity limit at −40 °C was then 50,000 cP. After discovering the corrosion problem, GM updated the fluid specification again and released DEXRON-II(D) in 1975.

GM DEXRON-II(C) licensed products have a license number on the container that begins with the letter C. This was the first GM ATF to advertise 50,000 miles between changes. This fluid is backward compatible with all previous DEXRON fluids as well as the Type "A" Suffix "A", and the Type "A" fluids produced from 1949 to 1966.

==== 1975 – DEXRON-II(D) ====
In 1975, GM released the DEXRON-II(D) specification (GM6032M). DEXRON-II(D) was composed of Group 2 base oil plus an additive package with alternative corrosion and rust inhibitors. The revised corrosion and rust inhibitors made the new fluid hygroscopic, which, while it was not a major problem in automatic transmissions, made DEXRON-II(D) unsuitable for other hydraulic systems in which it was commonly used. GM DEXRON-II(D) licensed products have a license number on the container that begins with the letter D. DEXRON-II was originally released with "C" qualification numbers; in 1975, after GM required a fix for a cooler corrosion problem and suppliers rolled over their approvals, the numbers were prefixed with "D", which led to the fluids being called DEXRON-II "C" or "D". This fluid is backward compatible with all previous DEXRON fluids as well as the Type "A" Suffix "A", and the Type "A" fluids produced from 1949 to 1966.

As a result of the 1973 OPEC Oil Embargo and fuel shortages, the U.S. government created the Corporate Average Fuel Economy (CAFE) regulations in 1975. The regulations were to be fully implemented by the 1978 model year. The automotive industry responded by changing to three typically unused transmission technologies:

- A 4th gear (overdrive)
- A Torque Converter Clutch (TCC)
- Front Wheel Drive (FWD)

The 1978 introduction of the TCC led to customer complaints of a shudder while driving. All vehicle manufacturers made changes to their ATF specifications and the controls of their TCC to try to alleviate the problem. GM released a revision to the DEXRON-II(D) fluid specification in 1978, Chrysler released the ATF+2 fluid specification (MS-7176D) in 1980, and Ford released the Mercon Type "H' fluid specification (M2C166-H) in 1981.

This fluid was first used in the following transmissions:

- 1976 GM Hydra-Matic 200 3-Speed Automatic Transmission
- 1976 GM Hydra-Matic 250 3-Speed Automatic Transmission
- 1978 GM Hydra-Matic 325 3-Speed Transaxle w/TCC
- 1979 GM Hydra-Matic 125 3-Speed Transaxle w/TCC
- 1982 GM Hydra-Matic 200-4R 4-Speed Transmission w/TCC
- 1983 GM Hydra-Matic 700-R4 4-Speed Transmission w/TCC
- 1984 GM Hydra-Matic 440-T4 4-Speed Transaxle w/TCC

The equivalent on ELF is RenaultMatic D2.

==== 1990 – DEXRON-II(E) ====
Front label

Back label

Unilube Premium DEXRON-IIE & MERCON ATF, front and back labels. The back label shows GM License No. E25378 and Ford Mercon License No. M920904.

In the 1990s, electronic controls of the transmission phased out the old hydraulic/mechanically controlled system. GM was first to market with Cadillac Allante's electronic-controlled transmission system, THM F-7, in 1987, followed by Chrysler and Toyota in 1988, and Ford in 1989. Electronic control of shift pattern (when it shifts), shift timing (how long it takes to shift), shift quality (shift feel), line pressure, and TCC apply and release rates were all affected by the cold temperature performance of the ATF flowing through solenoids.

In 1990, DEXRON-II (E) (GM Spec GM6137M) was released. DEXRON-II (E) was composed of Group 2 base oil plus an additive package. According to the GM Technical Service Bulletin 92-7-2 issued on October 2, 1991, DEXRON-II(E) has better anti-foaming characteristics, improved low-temperature flow characteristics (low-temperature viscosity), and improved high-temperature oxidation stability. The bulletin stated that DEXRON-II(E) could be used wherever DEXRON-II had previously been specified and was back-serviceable to 1949 in all GM automatic transmissions. This fluid's low-temperature performance was also improved (20,000 cP at -40 °C vs. 50,000 cP at -40 °C).

GM DEXRON-II (E) licensed products have a license number on the container that begins with the letter E. Some fluids carried both a GM and a Ford license number; for example, the label of Unilube Premium DEXRON-IIE & MERCON Transmission Fluid, sold by Coastal Unilube, Inc. of West Memphis, Arkansas, shows DEXRON-IIE license number E25378 and MERCON license number M920904, and recommends the fluid where DEXRON-IIE, MERCON, Ford M2C166-H or Ford M2C138CJ fluids are required. This fluid is backward compatible with all previous DEXRON fluids as well as the Type "A" suffix "A" and the Type "A" fluids produced from 1949 to 1966.

This fluid was first used in the following transmissions:

- 1991 GM Hydra-Matic 4L80-E (GM's first mass-produced electronically controlled transmission)

The DEXRON-II (E) fluid specification was revised in August 1992. This fluid was first used in the following transmissions:

- 1993 GM Hydra-Matic 4L60-E 4-Speed, electronically controlled transmission
- 1993 GM Hydra-Matic 4T60-E 4-Speed, electronically controlled transaxle

==== 1993 – DEXRON-III(F) ====
In 1993, GM released the new DEXRON-III (F) fluid (GM Spec GM6297M); the specification was originated in April 1993 and first published in March 1995.

DEXRON-III (F) was composed of Group 2+ base oil plus an additive package. According to GM service manual update 57-02-01, issued March 1, 1995, the improvements in Dexron-III (F) include better friction stability, higher high-temperature oxidation stability, and better material compatibility. Dexron-III (F) has the same low-temperature fluidity as Dexron-II (E), for better transmission performance in cold weather. GM phased DEXRON-III into all of its North American assembly plants starting February 1, 1994. This specification failed to address a number of issues concerning long-term durability, such as shear stability and fluid oxidation.

DEXRON-III (F) underwent a number of iterations in an attempt to address various shortcomings but was eventually replaced by new thinking, i.e., DEXRON-VI (J). GM DEXRON-III (F) licensed products have a license number on the can that begins with the letter F. By 1998 more than 650 licensed DEXRON-III fluids were on the market, made with additive technology from three additive companies. Because the specification predated GM's Electronically Controlled Capacity Clutch (EC^{3}), a continuously slipping torque converter clutch that entered low-volume production in the 1996 model year, GM added an EC^{3} vehicle shudder test to DEXRON-III qualification. This fluid is backward compatible with all previous DEXRON fluids as well as the Type "A" suffix "A" and the Type "A" fluids produced from 1949 to 1966.

In 1994–1995, some early OBD-II phase-in vehicles experienced a P0300 DTC (random misfire). Engineers determined that road forces being transferred through the TCC were affecting the normal rotational fluctuations of the crankshaft and tricking the ECM into thinking there was a cylinder misfire.

The solution was to create a new kind of TCC that would normally slip around 35 rpm. GM called it the Variable Capacity Converter Clutch (VCCC); other manufacturers had their own names. Some VCCC systems had a shudder or vibration during normal operation. Engineers tried several computer calibration changes, but a revised fluid was also needed to address the issue.

Ford released the new Mercon V Fluid Specification in 1996; GM released the DEXRON-III (G) Fluid Specification (GM6417M) in 1998; and Chrysler released the MS-9602 Change C Fluid Specification in 1999.

This fluid was first used in the following transmissions:

- 1997 GM Hydra-Matic 4T65-E 4-Speed Transaxle with Variable Capacity Converter Clutch (VCCC)

==== 1998 – DEXRON-III(G) ====
Released in December 1998, GM's DEXRON-III (G) specification (GM6417M) was a synthetic blend automatic transmission fluid, specially developed to address the VCCC shuddering issue. It is also suitable for power steering systems, some hydraulic systems, and rotary air compressors where excellent low-temperature fluidity is required.

GM DEXRON-III (G) licensed products have a license number on the can that begins with the letter G. This fluid is backward compatible with all previous DEXRON fluids as well as the Type "A" suffix "A" and the Type "A" fluids produced from 1949 to 1966.

==== 2003 – DEXRON III (H) ====
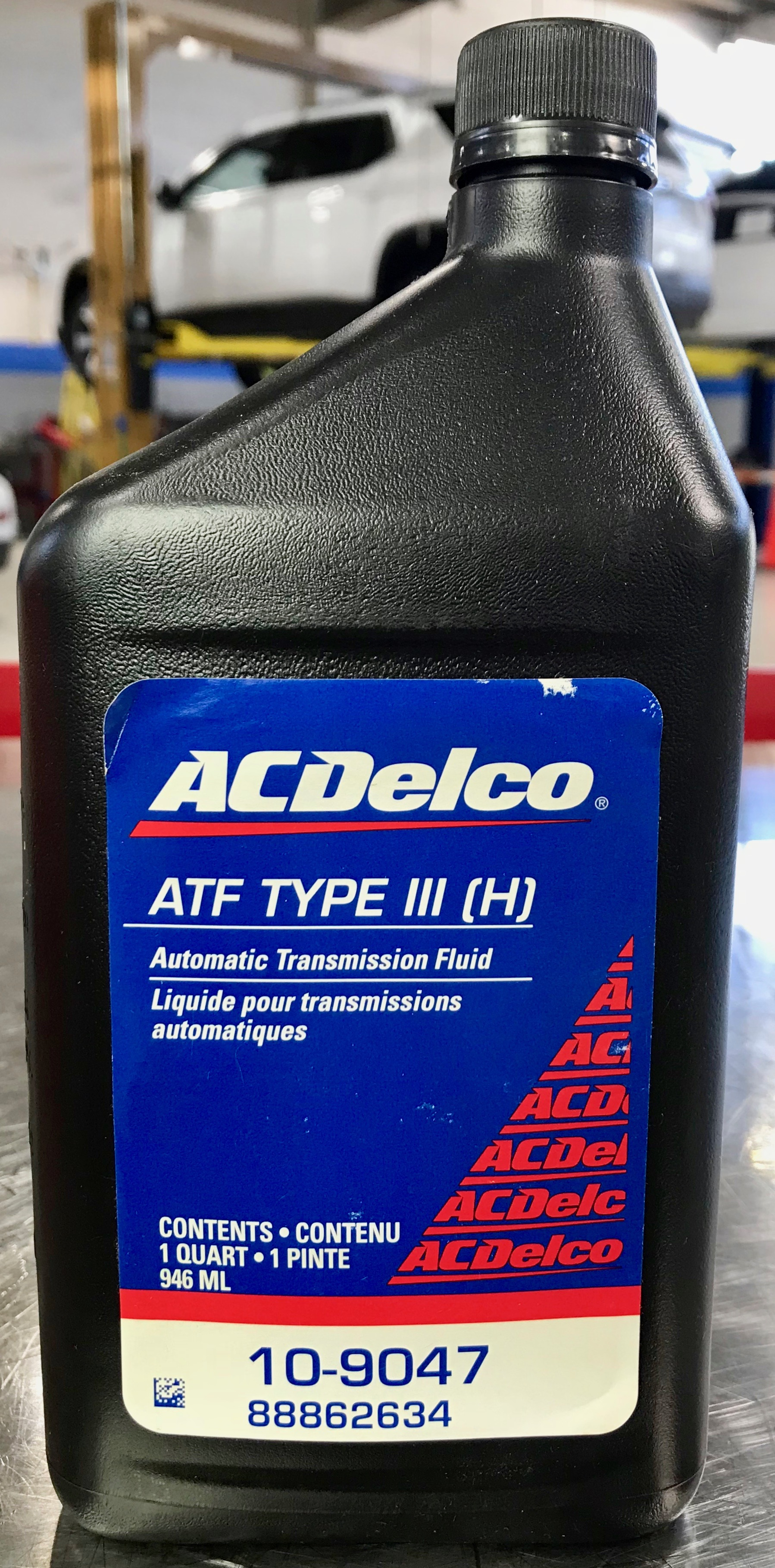
Unlicensed ACDelco ATF Type III(H)

GM's DEXRON III (H) specification (GMN10055), originated in April 2003 and first published in December 2003, replaced III (G). The H is an additive package for an updated friction modifier and with an oxidatively stable base oil (group 2). Oils according to this specification have longer maintenance of friction properties and anti-shudder properties, better foam control, and a longer fluid life. universal for all automatic transmissions with and without controlled torque converter lockup clutch, the so-called GKÜB for gear-clutch-lock.

GM DEXRON-III (H) licensed products prior to 2011 had a license number on the can that began with the letter H.

The GMN10055 specification was made inactive, with no replacement, in March 2011, as were the earlier DEXRON-III specifications GM6297M and GM6417M. The ATF Type III (H) fluid shown in the photograph is ACDelco's non-licensed fluid, which is used to support older transmissions that still required the DEXRON-III (H) fluid. This fluid is backward compatible with all previous Dexron fluids as well as the Type "A" suffix "A" and the Type "A" fluids produced from 1949 to 1966.

The fluid on ELF is FluidMatic D3.

==== 2005 – DEXRON-VI(J) ====
In a joint venture, Ford and GM collaborated on the development of a new 6-speed FWD transaxle (6T70/6F50). Both companies would share the designs and build their own transmissions. The design of these transmissions required a new fluid.

In 2005, Ford released the Mercon Low Viscosity (LV) fluid and GM released the DEXRON-VI specification. More than 100 formulations were later licensed by GM under the DEXRON-VI specification. The fluid specification for DEXRON-VI (J) was first used as the GM factory-fill automatic transmission fluid for the model year 2006. Roy Fewkes, GM Powertrain Staff Project Engineer and Chairman of the GM ATF/Driveline Lubricants Approval Committee patented the new DEXRON-VI (J) fluid composition under US Patent US8642519B2

DEXRON-VI is of a slightly lower viscosity when new compared to the prior DEXRON fluids (a maximum of 6.4 cSt at 100 °C for DEXRON-VI and 7.5 cSt for DEXRON-III), but the allowed viscosity loss from shearing of the ATF during use is lower for DEXRON-VI, resulting in the same lowest allowed final viscosity for both DEXRON-III and DEXRON-VI (5.5 cSt) in test. In reality, most of the DEXRON-III fluids typically sheared to about 4.2 cSt in use. The lower, more stable viscosity improved pumping efficiency within the transmission and fluid stability over life. Since Dexron VI is not allowed to thin out (lower its viscosity) as much as Dexron III during use, it requires the use of higher-quality, more shear-stable (less prone to thinning while in use) formulations. The container rear label reads "Full Synthetic Automatic Transmission Fluid"; however, the base oil composition is not stated. The current GM specification that defines the fluid is GMW16444, which superseded the original specification, GMN10060.

All DEXRON-III (H) licenses expired permanently at the end of 2011, and GM now supports only DEXRON-VI fluids for use in their older automatic transmissions. Aftermarket fluids asserted by their manufacturers to meet DEXRON-III(H) and earlier standards continue to be sold under names such as DEX/Merc. These fluids are not regulated or endorsed by GM.

GM DEXRON-VI(J) licensed products have a license number on the container that begins with the letter J, for example J-60301 on a GM Vehicle Care quart and J-60003 on an ACDelco quart. This was the first GM ATF to advertise 100,000 miles (160,000 km) between changes for "Normal Driving" conditions and 50,000 miles (80,000 km) for "Severe Service". This fluid is backward compatible with DEXRON-III(H) and DEXRON-III(G) fluids only. GM's own label states that DEXRON-VI "replaces DEXRON-III and DEXRON III-H in all applications except power steering and manual transmissions", that it "does not replace T-IV transmission fluid", and that some GM vehicles were not designed for it, including the Chevrolet Aveo, Epica, Equinox and Optra, the Pontiac Torrent, Vibe and Wave, and the Saturn Astra, S Series and CVT automatic transmissions, referring readers to service bulletin 04-07-30-037C.

This fluid was first used in the following transmissions:

- 2007 6T70/6T75 Transaxles
- 2007 6L80 Transmission

The fluid on ELF is FluidMatic G6 SYN.

==== 2013 – DEXRON-HP ====
With increasing CAFE regulations, smaller engines with very narrow torque bands were being put in vehicles with 6- and 8-speed transmissions to improve fuel economy. A new fluid revision was needed for the proper operation of the new 2015 GM 8L90 and 8L45 8-Speed RWD/4WD automatic transmissions. This was GM's first "lifetime" fluid, with no fluid or filter changes required under "normal" driving conditions. The current GM specification that defines the fluid is GMW16974.

There have been two versions of this fluid specification:

1. In July 2013, GM released the Low Viscosity (LV) Dexron-HP (High Performance) Fluid Specification. As shown on the photograph of the rear panel, the 2013 Dexron HP is composed of a group 4 polyalphaolefin (PAO) base oil and additives provided by the Afton Chemical Corporation. The rear panel label of early containers of this fluid incorrectly states that this fluid is backward compatible with previous DEXRON ATF; it is not. The label was corrected on later bottles of the fluid.
2. In May 2017, a revision was made to the GMW16974 fluid specification. A change to a Group III+ base oil rather than a Group 4 PAO base oil was made, as was another additive package option from Afton Chemical Corporation.

GM DEXRON-HP licensed products have a license number on the container that begins with the letter J.

The 2018 Chevrolet Colorado owner's manual, for example, specifies DEXRON-VI for the 6-speed automatic transmission and DEXRON-HP for the 8-speed automatic transmission.

This fluid was first used in the following transmissions:

- 2015 8L90, 8L45, 8-speed RWD/4WD vehicles
- 2017 1ET25 Chevrolet Bolt EV drive unit
- 2018 9T50 9-Speed FWD/AWD transaxle

==== 2014 – DEXRON-ULV ====
The fluid specification for DEXRON-ULV (ultra-low viscosity) was introduced on January 2, 2014. DEXRON-ULV is composed of a Group 3+ base oil and additives needed for the proper operation of the 2017 and above GM 10L90 and the Ford 10R80 10-Speed rear-wheel-drive automatic transmission.

This transmission and the transmission fluid specification were co-developed by Ford and GM. The current specification that defines the fluid is Ford WSS-M2C949-A. This fluid is also marketed as Mercon ULV.

The quart containers of DEXRON-ULV must be shaken to stir up the additives before pouring. This fluid is not backward compatible with any previous fluids.

This fluid was first used in the 2017 10L90 10-Speed Automatic Transmission.

==== 2016 – Mobil 1 Synthetic LV ATF HP "Black Label" ====
In 2016, a new fluid specification for a "DEXRON Approved" Mobil 1 Synthetic LV ATF HP was introduced in GM Technical Service Bulletin 16-NA-175. The revision was to help correct a torque converter clutch shudder in the GM 8L90, 8L80, and 8L45 automatic transmissions.

DEXRON LV ATF HP is made by Mobil and is marketed as Mobil 1 LV ATF HP. DEXRON LV ATF HP is composed of a poly-alpha-olefin (PAO) Group IV base oil and additives developed by Afton Chemical needed for the proper operation of the 2015 and above GM 8L90 8-Speed rear-wheel drive automatic transmission. The current GM specification that defines the fluid is GMW16974 (2nd Edition, May 2017).

==== 2016 – DEXRON III(K) for Manual Transmissions ====
On August 1, 2016, GM released the DEXRON III (K) fluid specification (GM Spec GMW17639) as a fluid to support older GM manual transmissions and power steering systems requiring the previously discontinued DEXRON-III (H) fluid.

Warning: The additive package for automatic transmissions has been removed from this fluid; do not use it in any automatic transmission.

==== 2018 – Mobil 1 Synthetic LV ATF HP "Blue Label" ====
On October 1, 2018, a special fluid specification (GMNA-9986555) was introduced for a revised "DEXRON Approved" Mobil 1 Synthetic LV ATF HP. This revised fluid was introduced in GM Technical Service Bulletin 18-NA-355 in December 2018. The revision is to help correct a torque converter clutch shudder in the GM 8L90 and 8L45 automatic transmissions after a complete flush of the system.

DEXRON LV ATF LV is made by Mobil and is marketed as Mobil-1 LV ATF HP. Mobil-1 LV ATF HP is composed of a Gas to liquids (GTL) Group 3+ Base oil and additives developed by Infineum needed for the proper operation of the 2015 and above GM 8L90 and 8L45 8-Speed rear wheel drive automatic transmission.

Containers of this fluid have a revised blue and silver label on the front of the container. This "DEXRON Approved" DEXRON-HP product has a J-62120 license number on the rear label of the container.

== GM "Lifetime" ATF ==
=== Example maintenance schedule ===
GM ATF Change Interval under "Normal Driving" Conditions*
Fluid Specification	Miles
1940 Hydra-Matic	5,000
1949 Type "A"	10,000
1957 Type "A" Suffix "A"	15,000
1967 Dexron (B)	24,000
1973 Dexron-II(C)	50,000
1975 Dexron-II(D)	50,000
1990 Dexron-II(E)	100,000
1993 Dexron-III(F)	100,000
1998 Dexron-III(G)	100,000
2003 Dexron-III(H)	100,000
2006 Dexron-VI(J)	100,000
2013 Dexron-HP	150,000
2014 Dexron-ULV	150,000
*See your vehicle maintenance guide for definition of "Normal Driving" conditions and recommended service interval

GM Lifetime automatic transmission fluids made from higher-quality base oil and an additive package are more chemically stable, less reactive, and do not experience oxidation as easily as lower-quality fluids made from lower-quality base oil and an additive package. Therefore, higher-quality transmission fluids can last a long time in normal driving conditions (typically 100,000 miles (160,934 km) or more).

The definition of "lifetime fluid" differs from transmission manufacturer to transmission manufacturer. Always consult the vehicle maintenance guide for the proper service interval for the fluid in your transmission and your driving conditions.

Chevrolet Colorado Example: According to the Scheduled Maintenance Guide of a 2018 Chevrolet Colorado with "Lifetime Fluid," the vehicle could have two different fluid service intervals depending upon how it is driven:

==== 1. Normal Driving ====
- Carry passengers and cargo within the recommended limits on the Tire and Loading Information label.
- Driven on reasonable road surfaces within legal driving limits.

Under "normal" driving conditions, the automatic transmission fluid and filter never need to be changed.

==== 2. Severe Driving ====
- Mainly driven in heavy city traffic in hot weather
- Mainly driven in hilly or mountainous terrain
- Frequently towing a trailer
- Used for high speed or competitive driving
- Used for taxi, police, or delivery service.

Under "Severe" driving conditions, replace automatic transmission fluid and filter every 45,000 mi (72,420 km)

Base Stock Oil Categories for GM ATF based upon timeline of availability vs. fluid life under "Normal" driving
API BaseStock Oil	Miles
1940 Group 1	5,000
1949 Group 1	10,000
1957 Group 1	15,000
1967 Group 1*	24,000
1973 Group 1*	50,000
1975 Group 1*	50,000
1990 Group 2	100,000
1993 Group 2	100,000
1998 Group 2+	100,000
2003 Group 2+	100,000
2006 Group 4	100,000
2013 Group 3+	150,000
2014 Group 3+	150,000
*Hydrotreated Group 1

GM ATF Change Interval under "Severe Driving" Conditions*
Fluid Specification	Miles
1940 Hydra-Matic	2,500
1949 Type "A"	5,000
1957 Type "A" Suffix "A"	7,500
1967 Dexron (B)	12,000
1973 Dexron-II(C)	25,000
1975 Dexron-II(D)	25,000
1990 Dexron-II(E)	50,000
1993 Dexron-III(F)	50,000
1998 Dexron-III(G)	50,000
2003 Dexron-III(H)	50,000
2006 Dexron-VI(J)	50,000
2013 Dexron-HP	45,000
2014 Dexron-ULV	45,000
*See your vehicle maintenance guide for definition of "Severe Driving" conditions and recommended service interval

== See also ==
- Mercon ATF
- Chrysler automatic transmission fluids
