= Automatic transmission fluid =

Hydraulic fluid used in vehicles with automatic transmissions

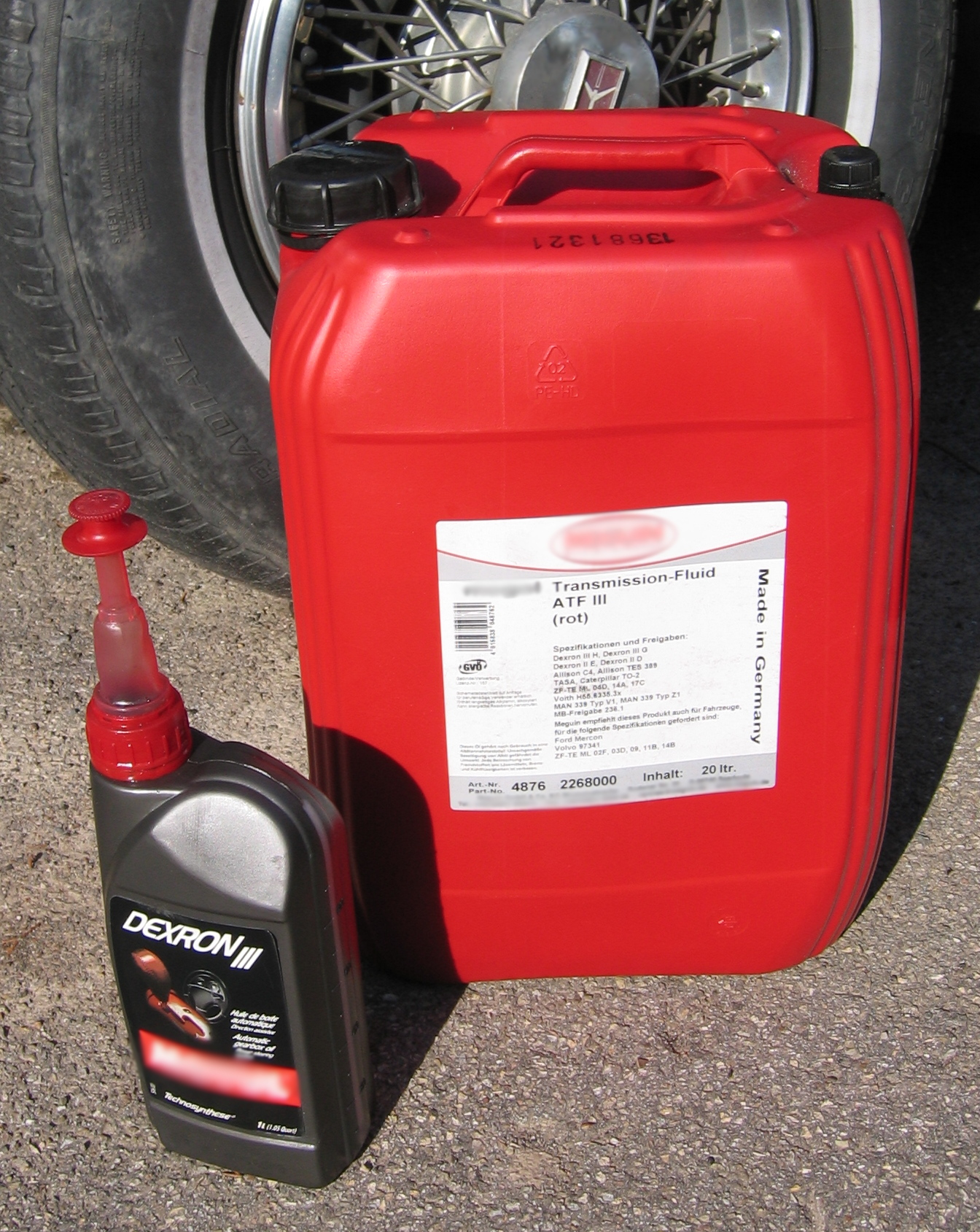
Automatic transmission fluid

Automatic transmission fluid (ATF) is a hydraulic fluid that is essential for the proper functioning of vehicles equipped with automatic transmissions. Usually, it is coloured red or green to differentiate it from motor oil and other fluids in the vehicle.

This fluid is designed to meet the unique demands of an automatic transmission. It is formulated to ensure smooth valve operation, minimize brake band friction, facilitate torque converter function, and provide effective gear lubrication.

ATF is commonly utilized as a hydraulic fluid in certain power steering systems, as a lubricant in select 4WD transfer cases, and in modern manual transmissions.

== Modern use ==
Modern ATF consists of a base oil, a viscosity index improver and an additive package that contains a wide variety of chemical compounds intended to provide the required properties of a particular ATF specification. Most ATFs contain some combination of additives that improve lubricating qualities, such as anti-wear additives, rust and corrosion inhibitors, detergents, dispersants and surfactants (which protect and clean metal surfaces); kinematic viscosity and viscosity index improvers and modifiers, seal swell additives and agents (which extend the rotational speed range and temperature range of the additives' application); anti-foam additives and anti-oxidation compounds to inhibit oxidation and "boil-off" (which extends the life of the additives' application); cold-flow improvers, pour point depressant and petroleum dye. All ATFs contain friction modifiers, except for those ATFs specified for some Ford transmissions and the John Deere J-21A specification; the Ford ESP (or ESW) - M2C-33 F specification Type F ATF (Ford-O-Matic) and Ford ESP (or ESW) - M2C-33 G specification Type G ATF (1980s Ford Europe and Japan) specifically excludes the addition of friction modifiers. According to the same oil distributor, the M2C-33 G specification requires fluids which provide improved shear resistance and oxidation protection, better low-temperature fluidity, better EP (extreme pressure) properties and additional seal tests over and above M2C-33 F quality fluids. According to SAE J311, an ATF typically consists of 85 to 90% base oil and 10 to 15% performance additive package, including a red dye that identifies the fluid as automatic transmission fluid.

The friction modifier means that the fluid sticks to the surface of the metal slightly stronger, and therefore only helps to prevent early wear. It would be required for Ford and BorgWarner to prove that their transmissions are somehow harmed by friction modifiers. Ford recommended Type F fluid (ESW-M2C33-F) for its C6 transmission in 1966–1976 models, and ESP-M2C138-CJ or Dexron II fluid for 1977–1979 models.

There are many specifications for ATF, such as the General Motors (GM) DEXRON and the Ford MERCON series, and the vehicle manufacturer will identify the ATF specification appropriate for each vehicle. The vehicle's owner's manual will typically list the ATF specification(s) that are recommended by the manufacturer. A 2007 GM comparison of seven OEM fluids in industry standard tests concluded that each ATF is uniquely formulated to specific OEM requirements and that owners should not deviate from the fluid specified in the owner's manual.

Automatic transmission fluids have many performance-enhancing chemicals added to the fluid to meet the demands of each transmission. Ford advises against using supplemental ATF additives, treatments or cleaning agents. An SAE review of driveline fluids likewise says top-treatments added to a finished fluid are never recommended, because they can upset the balance of the additive package, and notes that Japanese manufacturers recommend only their own factory-fill "genuine" fluid for service fill. Some ATF specifications are open to competing brands, such as the common DEXRON specification, where different manufacturers use different chemicals to meet the same performance specification. These products are sold under license from the OEM responsible for establishing the specification. Some vehicle manufacturers will require "genuine" or Original Equipment Manufacturer (OEM) ATF. Most ATF formulations are open 3rd party licensing and certification by the automobile manufacturer.

== Current fluids ==
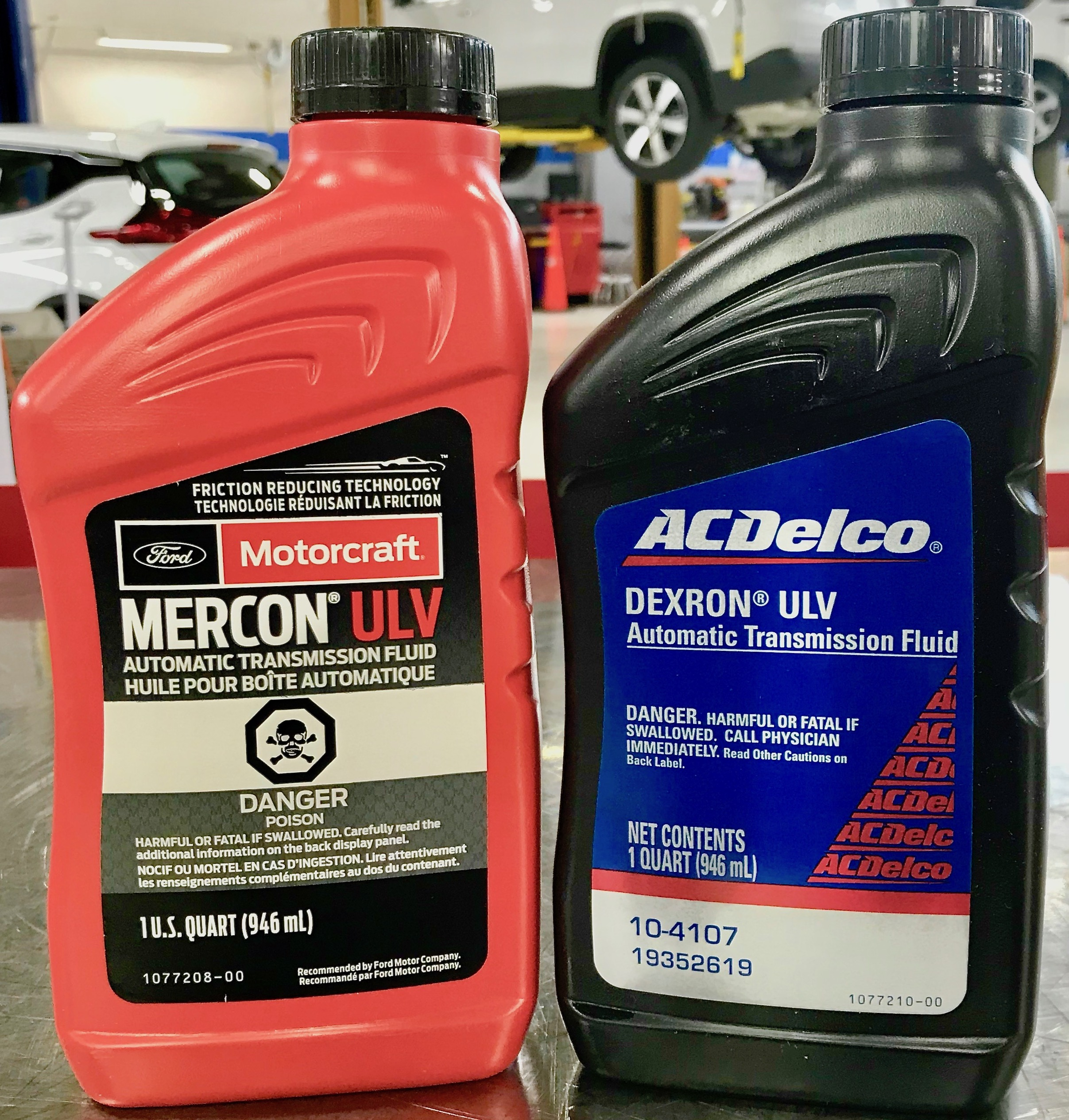
2014 Ford Mercon ULV and ACDelco Dexron-ULV ATF

- DEXRON ULV - 2017 and later GM 10L90 10-speed automatic transmissions
- MERCON ULV - 2017 and later Ford 10R80 10-speed automatic transmissions. In the 2018 Ford F-150, for example, the 10-speed automatic specifies MERCON ULV (WSS-M2C949-A), while the 6-speed automatic and the transfer case use MERCON LV (WSS-M2C938-A).
- DEXRON HP - 2013 and later GM 8L90 8-speed RWD automatic transmissions
- Mopar ATF+4 (Chrysler MS-9602) – introduced as a running change in 2000-model-year Chrysler minivans and by 2001 the factory fill for all vehicles with Chrysler automatic transmissions. Chrysler recommended it for servicing all vehicles with Chrysler automatic transmissions except 1999 and earlier minivans, which were to stay on ATF+3 because of possible torque converter shudder. ATF+4 can top off transmissions containing ATF+2 or ATF+3, but ATF+2 or ATF+3 must not be added to one filled with ATF+4.
- DEXRON III/MERCON - Most pre-2006 GM and Ford, Mercury, Lincoln, many pre-2004 Toyota products, many Asian vehicles, some Asian power steering fluid applications, some Ford/Mazda manual transmissions. It is generally less expensive than DEXRON VI/MERCON V .
- DEXRON VI - Most after 2006 GM, some Ford applications, replaces DEXRON III in GM automatic transmissions.
- MERCON V - Most Ford, Mercury, Lincoln, Mazda B-Series, 2001-08 Mazda Tribute, Tribute Hybrid.
- MERCON LV - Some Ford(DuratecHE), 2009-11 Mazda Tribute, Mazda in Europe or Asia.
- Mercon SP - For the Ford 6R transmission
- Toyota ATF Type T-IV (T4) – Some older Toyota and Lexus models (including the first-generation Prius hybrid transaxle), some Mazda. Introduced in 1998, it made Type T-II obsolete and may be used wherever Type T or T-II is specified; neither T-IV nor the other Toyota types may be used in place of DEXRON II or III, or the reverse. Aftermarket T-IV-type fluids are sold to the JWS 3309 specification.
- Toyota ATF WS ("World Standard") – Many Toyota models from the 2004 model year on, including the 2004–2015 Prius, 4Runner and Land Cruiser. Toyota states that ATF WS is not compatible with T-IV or DEXRON fluids.
- Honda DW-1 - All Honda and Acura (except continuously variable transmission (CVT)), replaces Z1 specification fluid.
- Diamond SP-III (or SP3) - Older Mitsubishi Motors (including older CVTs; Hyundai and Kia 4-speed automatic transmission.
- Diamond SP-IV (or SP4) - All Hyundai and Kia 6-speed automatic transmission.
- DiaQueen ATF-J3 - Most Mitsubishi Motors 6-speed automatic transmissions.
- Nissan Matic fluids - For Nissan and Infiniti vehicles:
  - Matic D is for 3- and 4-speed transmissions,
  - Matic K is for 6-speed front-wheel-drive transmissions,
  - Matic J is for 5-speed rear-wheel-drive transmissions,
  - Matic-S fluid supersedes Matic-J fluid.
- ATF-HP - For 2005 and later Subaru vehicles, except CVTs. 2004 and earlier Subaru vehicles use DEXRON III.
- Mazda M5 (MV) fluid - For the Mazda FN4A-EL/Ford 4F27E and Mazda FS5A-EL/Ford FNR5. Also sold as Ford FNR5 fluid. Genuine Mazda M5 is made by Idemitsu Kosan, available as Idemitsu Type-M. This fluid is NOT MERCON V.
- Mazda FZ fluid - For the SKYACTIV-Drive. The color of this fluid is blue.

Synthetic ATF is available in modern OEM and aftermarket brands, offering better performance and service life for certain applications (such as frequent trailer towing).

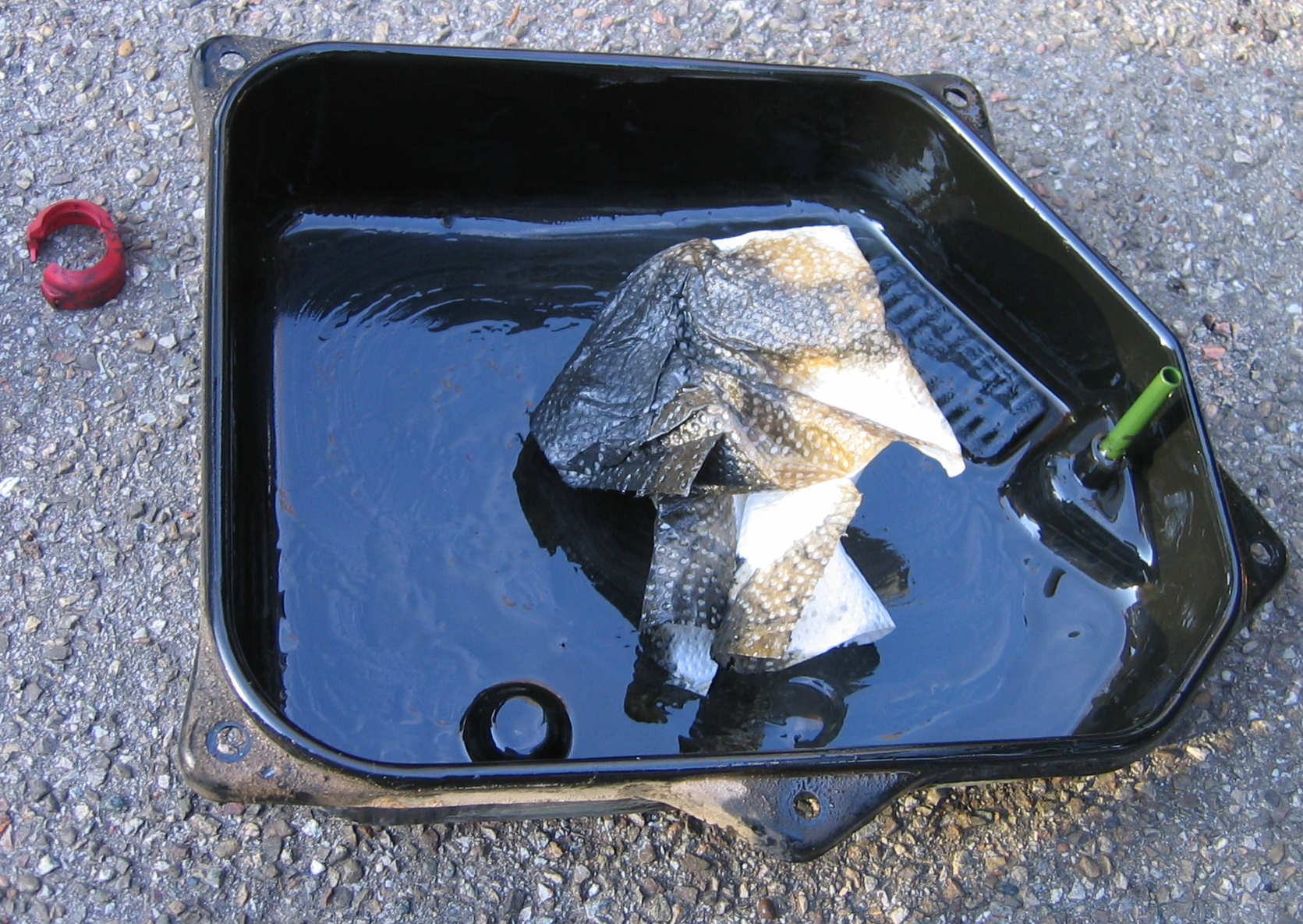
Oil pan of an automatic transmission with sedimented wear

Using a lint-free white rag to wipe the dipstick on automatic transmissions is advised so that the color of the fluid can be checked. Dark brown or black ATF can be an indicator of a transmission problem, vehicle abuse, or fluid that has far exceeded its useful life. Overused ATF often has reduced lubrication properties and abrasive friction materials (from clutches and brake bands) suspended in it; failure to replace such fluid will accelerate transmission wear and could eventually ruin an otherwise healthy transmission. However, color alone is not a completely reliable indication of the service life of ATF, as most ATF products will darken with use. The manufacturer's recommended service interval is a more reliable measure of ATF life. In the absence of service or repair records, fluid color is a common means of gauging ATF service life. Ford's 1987 front-wheel-drive training manual, for example, told technicians that AXOD transaxle fluid "should be red; not brown or black".

CVTs and dual-clutch transmissions often use specialized fluids. Transfer cases and differentials in four-wheel-drive/all-wheel-drive vehicles sometimes require specialized fluids, such as Honda Dual Pump-II, Honda VTM-4, and Jeep Quadra-Trac.

== History ==
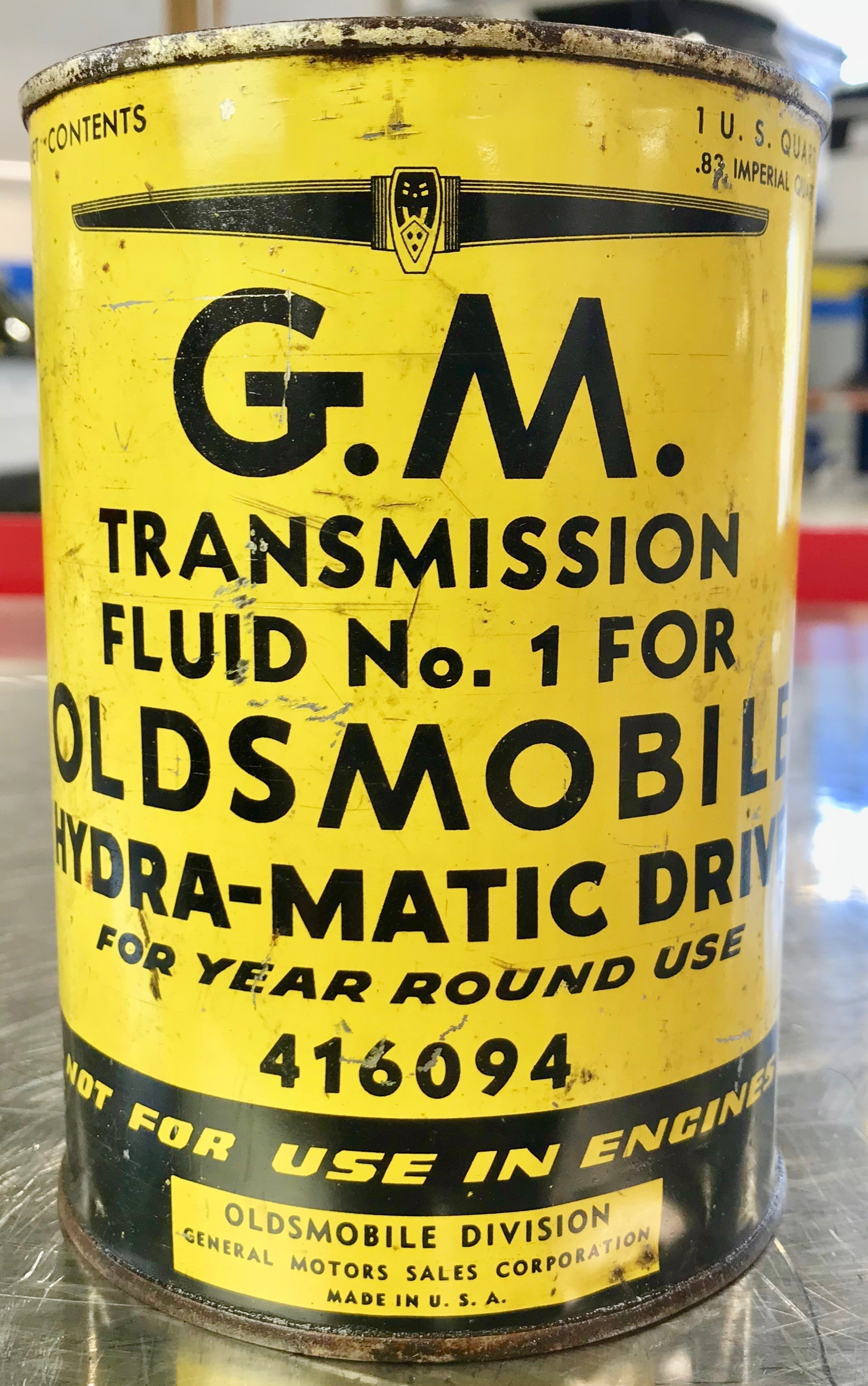
1940 GM Hydra-Matic Automatic Transmission Fluid

The history of automatic transmission fluids parallels the history of automatic transmission technology. The world's first mass-produced automatic transmission, the Hydra-Matic 4-speed, was developed by General Motors (GM) for the 1940 model year. The Hydra-Matic transmission required a special lubricant GM called Transmission Fluid No. 1. for the Hydra-Matic Drive. This transmission fluid was only available at Oldsmobile, Pontiac, and Cadillac dealerships. As technology advanced and OEMs demanded longer-lasting and higher-quality automatic transmissions, so too did automatic transmission fluids advance.

In 1949, GM released a new Type "A" fluid specification. To make qualified fluid available outside GM dealerships, GM engaged the Armour Research Foundation, part of the Illinois Institute of Technology, to assist in qualifying fluids, and each qualified fluid carried an AQ (Armour Qualification) number on its container. By 1956 Type A fluid was recommended by every U.S. passenger car manufacturer. Every automatic transmission produced by any vehicle manufacturer used GM Type "A" transmission fluids in their transmissions from 1949 to 1958. Service manuals of the period, such as Chevrolet's 1957 Powerglide and Turboglide, Buick's 1958 Flight Pitch Dynaflow and Pontiac's 1959 Hydra-Matic manuals, called for Type A fluid identified by an "AQ-ATF" number on the container, and Ford, Lincoln and Mercury manuals of 1953–1958 likewise specified "Automatic Transmission Fluid, Type A".

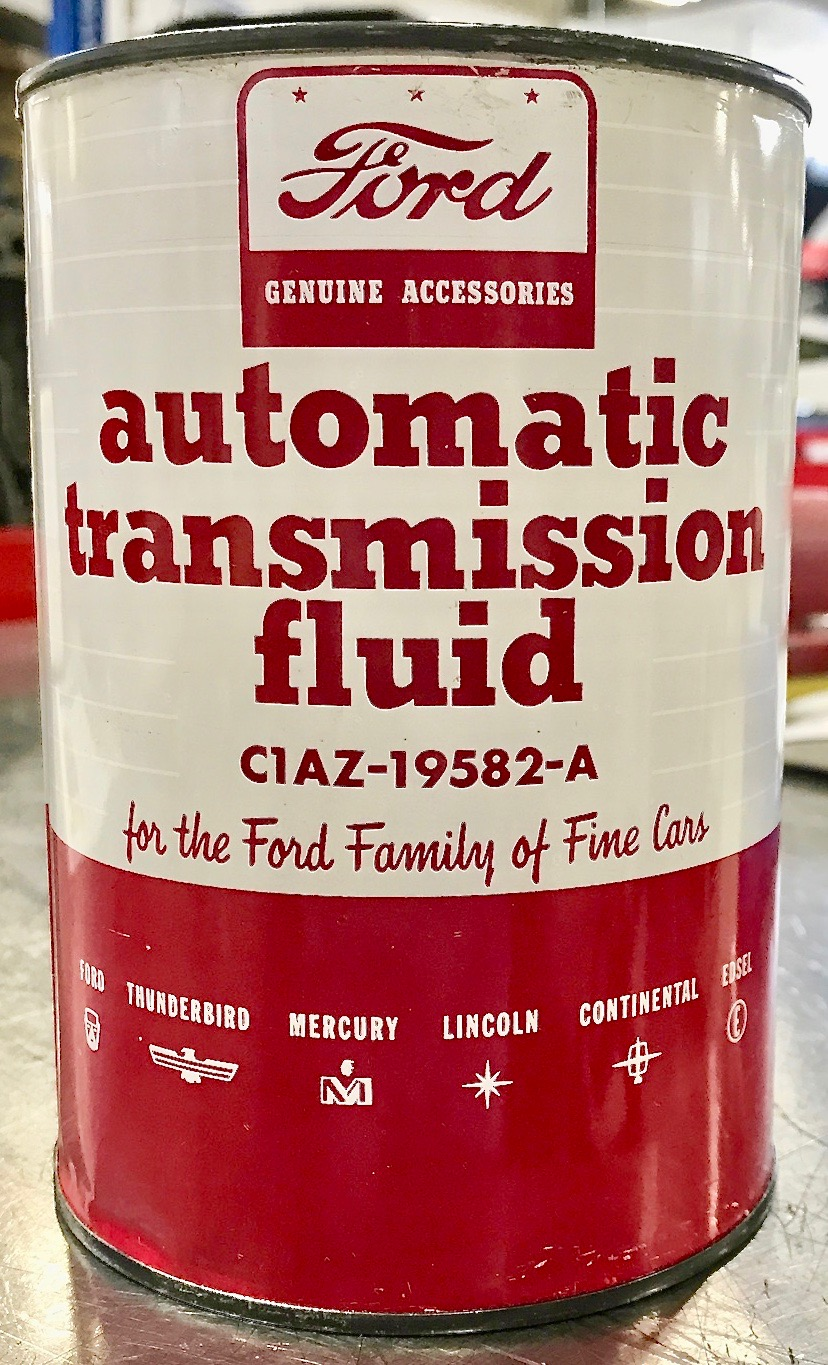
1960 Ford Type B ATF

In 1959, Ford began releasing their own automatic transmission fluid specifications; see MERCON for more information. From 1958 to 1968 many vehicle manufacturers continued to use the next GM automatic transmission fluid specification, the Type "A" Suffix "A" fluid, in their transmissions. In 1966, Chrysler began releasing their own automatic transmission fluid specifications; see Mopar ATF for more information. Chrysler's own fluids were sold under Chrysler Material Standard MS-7176; a 1986 Mopar "ATF+ Type 7176" quart is labeled as meeting MS-7176. Chrysler revised its factory-fill fluid from MS-7176D to MS-7176E in June 1997. Its replacement, ATF+4 (MS-9602), was developed with Texaco and Lubrizol around a Group III base oil, with limited work beginning in 1989 and a full-time program from 1994, and was intended as a fill-for-life fluid. GM ATF was the same color as engine oil through 1967. Aftermarket ATF was available with red dye as an aid in fluid leak detection. Dexron (B) was the first GM ATF to require red dye.

From the 1940s through the early 1970s, ATF contained whale oil as a rust and corrosion inhibitor. A moratorium on whale oil at that time prevented the continued production of older ATF such as the original 1967 DEXRON formulation (Type B), and the fluids which preceded it. Vintage GM (1940–1967), Ford (1951–1967, and Chrysler products (1953–1966) used GM Type A fluid or GM Type A Suffix A fluids; these fluids are no longer produced. GM lists Dexron-VI as the only approved fluid for warranty repairs on GM transmissions that originally required DEXRON-III or earlier DEXRON fluids. Ford recommends Mercon V fluid, and Chrysler recommends ATF+4 fluids for vintage transmission use.

Through the late 1970s, Ford transmissions were factory-filled with a fluid identified as ESW M2C33-F. To provide a fluid that would be available to the general public for service fill, oil companies and other factory fill suppliers were allowed to develop fluids meeting the ESW M2C33-F specification and market these fluids under their brand names but identified as Type F.

1954 Mopar Type A ATF

The second generation of transmission fluid was released in 1974 as the factory fill specification, ESW M2C138-CJ. This fluid was developed to modify the vehicle shifting characteristics and to provide considerable improvement in the oxidation resistance and anti-wear performance.

No service fluids were developed and for a short time, DEXRON fluids approved by General Motors were considered acceptable. With continuing changes and improvements in transmission design, a centrifugal lock-up torque converter clutch was introduced into the C5 transmission to smooth engine vibrations sensed by the occupant of the vehicle. An associated shudder problem forced the introduction of the factory fill specification ESP M2C166-H. Servicing transmissions with DEXRON fluids was unacceptable since not all DEXRON fluids were capable of eliminating the shudder phenomenon. The fluids that could be used were a subset of the DEXRON fluids. The advent of Type H as factory fill necessitated the development of a service fluid specification to match the performance expected from Type H. This resulted in the release of the MERCON specification in 1987. Ford's 1987 training material told technicians never to add Type A or Type F where CJ or H was specified, allowing DEXRON II only as an emergency top-up, and a May 1990 Ford chart allowed existing DEXRON-II stock in some applications but required new purchases to be MERCON.

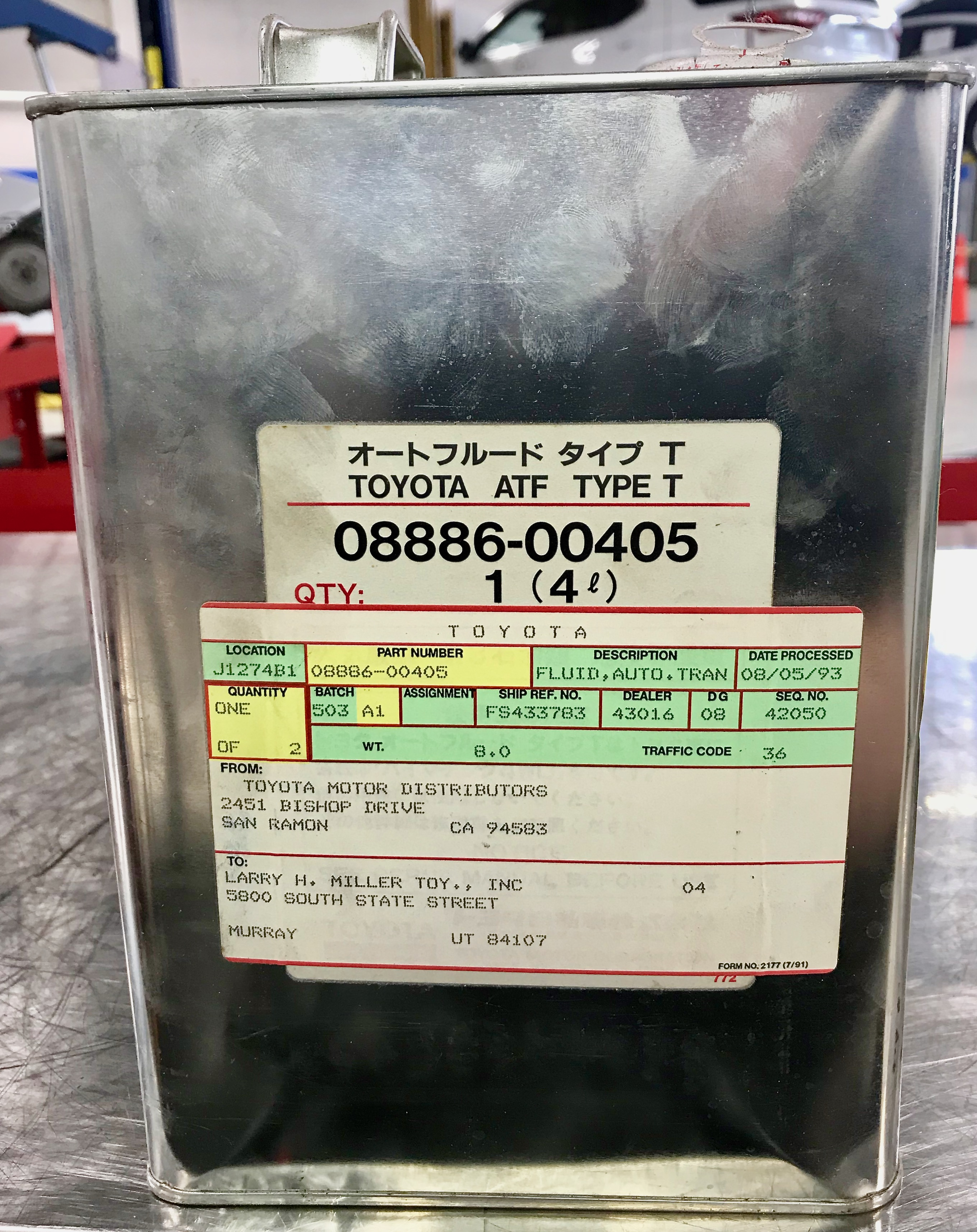
1988 Toyota Type T ATF

One major revision occurred in September 1992, when low-temperature viscosity requirements, volatility requirements, viscosity change limits after high-temperature exposure and improved oxidation limits were introduced. These changes raised the performance of MERCON fluids above ESP M2C166-H levels.

The development of modulating and continuous slipping clutch converters has prompted the need to develop the MERCON V specification. Included are requirements to verify the anti-wear capabilities and anti-shudder characteristics of the fluid.

The MERCON V specification was further modified sometime before 2007 to make it backwards-compatible with MERCON. Ford has/is terminating all license agreements for the manufacture and sale of MERCON in favor of MERCON V. When General Motors and Ford ended the DEXRON III and MERCON licenses in 2006–2007, the common "Dexron III/Mercon" service fluid, which made up about 59 percent of US ATF sales, was discontinued; the newer DEXRON VI and MERCON V required Group II or Group II-plus base oils. Before 2005, meeting both the current DEXRON and MERCON specifications had served as a de facto industry standard for service-fill ATF; by 2017 more than 100 different ATF specifications applied to the U.S. vehicle fleet, and SAE Technical Committee 3 had begun work on a performance-based ATF classification. Japanese manufacturers already had a minimum-performance standard, JASO M315 1A, for use when genuine fluid is not available.

Toyota used GM fluids such as DEXRON II and later DEXRON III in many of its automatic transmissions into the early 2000s; a 2002 Toyota bulletin lists DEXRON III (DEXRON II) for most 2000–2002 models and Type T-IV for the rest. Toyota's own "Automatic Transmission Fluid" sold for these applications (part no. 00718-ATF00) was labeled "Formulated to replace Dexron II or Dexron III in applicable Toyota models". Toyota also had fluids of its own: by 1988 the A241H automatic transaxle in the all-wheel-drive AE95 required Toyota Type T fluid. In 1993 Toyota introduced Type T-II for the A340E transmission in the turbocharged Supra; it could not be mixed with DEXRON II, Type T or any other ATF, while the non-turbo Supra continued to use DEXRON II. Type T-IV, introduced in 1998, made Type T-II obsolete. T-IV was developed by Tonen, Toyota and Esso for transmissions with slip-controlled lock-up clutches, which improve fuel economy but can cause "shudder" vibration; the fluid was designed to keep its anti-shudder properties over a long service life while retaining high clutch torque capacity. Its successor, ATF WS, was developed by Toyota as a lower-viscosity fluid for better fuel economy, using a high-viscosity-index base oil and a shear-stable viscosity index improver to maintain transmission durability; Toyota reported fuel-consumption reductions of 1.4% and 1.1% in two vehicle applications.

== "Lifetime" fluids ==
In 1967, Ford produced the Type-F fluid specification. The Type-F specification was developed to meet Ford's "fill-for-life" requirements, under which the fluid was not intended to be changed. This was the first of many Ford "lifetime" fluids. The 1974 Ford Car Shop Manual reads "The automatic transmission is filled at the factory with "lifetime" fluid. If it is necessary to add or replace fluid, use only fluids which meet Ford Specification M2C33F. Many other transmission manufacturers have followed with their own "Lifetime" automatic transmission fluids".

Ford's 2018 F-150 schedule calls for the automatic transmission fluid and filter to be changed every 150,000 miles (240,000 km) under normal use, with more frequent replacement (for example at 30,000 miles (48,000 km)) under special operating conditions. On 2000-model-year minivans filled with ATF+4, Chrysler listed no fluid change under normal maintenance ("Fill For Life") and a fluid and filter change every 48,000 miles (77,000 km) under severe service. Chrysler also stated that ATF+4's red dye is not permanent and that color and odor "are no longer indicators of fluid condition". Toyota's ATF WS bulletin calls for inspection only at the 100,000-mile maintenance interval and states that ATF WS "does NOT require any flushing or changing during the life of the vehicle". A 2003 Nippon Oil study described change intervals for genuine Japanese ATFs as ranging "from 100,000 km to 'fill for life'".

=== How ATF Can Last a "Lifetime" ===
To understand how a fluid can last a "lifetime", a study of the 1939 Chrysler Fluid Drive Fluid is helpful. The lesson learned by Chrysler with its fluid drives applies to modern automatic transmissions as well. The November 1954 edition of Lubrication Magazine (Published by The Texas Company, later known as Texaco) featured a story called "Evolution of the Chrysler PowerFlite Automatic Transmission." This article described the fluid used in the 1939 Chrysler Fluid Drive and its subsequent revisions and enhancements through 1954.

The fluid drive fluid coupling is partially filled with Mopar Fluid Drive Fluid, a special highly refined straight mineral oil with a viscosity of about 185 SUS at 100 °F., excellent inherent oxidation stability, high viscosity index (100), excellent ability to rapidly reject air, very low natural pour point (−25 °F.), ability to adequately lubricate the pilot ball bearing and seal surface, and neutrality towards the seal bellows.

The fluid operates under almost ideal conditions in what is essentially a hermetically sealed case; the small amount of atmospheric oxygen initially present is removed by a harmless reaction with the fluid to leave a residual inert (nitrogen) atmosphere. As a consequence, it has not been necessary to drain and replace the fluid, and the level-check recommendation has been successively extended from the original 2,500 miles to 15,500 miles and finally to "never" - or the life of the car.

Since drains and level checks were not only unnecessary but frequently harmful (through the introduction of more air, and seal-destroying dirt), Chrysler eventually left off the tempting level inspection plugs. This mechanism is, therefore, one of the very few that are lubricated for the life of the car. There are now myriad examples of couplings that have operated well over 100,000 miles without any attention whatsoever and were still in perfect condition when the car was retired.

On European-type cars, a "Lifetime" means 180,000 km or 112,000 miles as the lifetime of a vehicle or transmission. Service intervals of newer type cars are from 80,000 to 120,000 km which equals 50,000 to 75,000 miles. Flushing or refilling the fluid on lifetime-filled transmissions requires the use of equipment to fill from below, engaging the transmission torque converter or using an external pump.

=== Sealed Transmissions ===
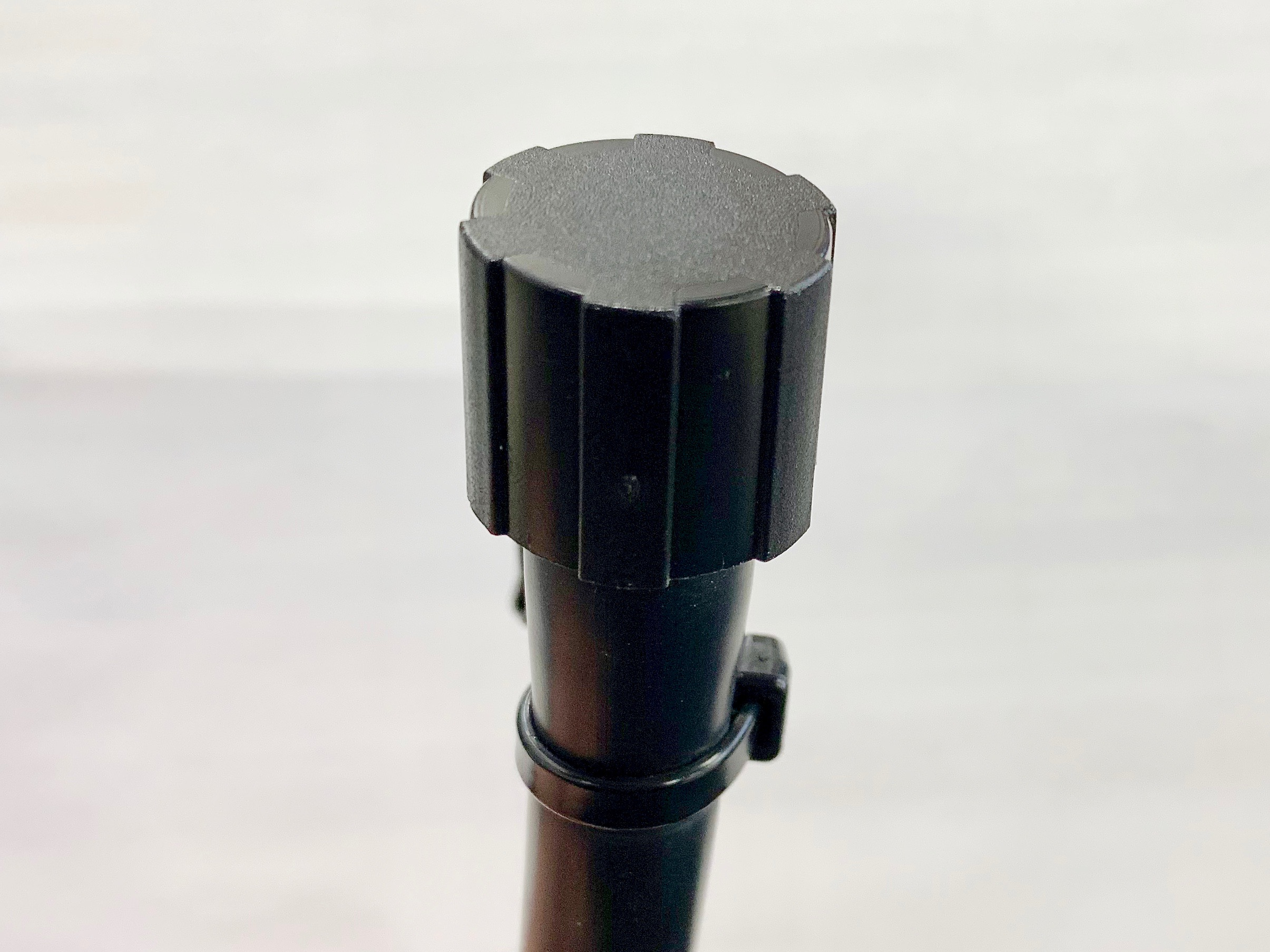
Umbrella style transmission breather to prevent water ingestion

Any automatic transmission fluid will last longer if the transmission case can be hermetically sealed, but transmissions typically have two potential entry points for air:

1. The Dipstick Tube. Any transmission with a dipstick tube has the potential to let additional oxygen into the transmission through a dipstick that is not fully seated in the tube or a dipstick tube plug that is not fully seated. Even the process of checking the fluid level with a dipstick can allow additional oxygen and dirt to be transmitted. Many modern transmissions do not have a dipstick. They have sealed transmission fluid level check plugs instead. By removing the traditional dipstick, the transmission manufacturer has also removed a potential entry point for oxygen; this reduces the potential for fluid oxidation. A sealed transmission will typically have a longer transmission fluid life than a non-sealed transmission.
2. The Transmission Vent. Transmissions need vents to compensate for internal air pressure changes that occur with fluctuating fluid temperatures and fluctuating fluid levels during transmission operation. Without those vents, pressure could build resulting in seal and gasket leaks. Before the use of better quality base oil in ATF in the late 1990s, some older transmission breather vents contained a Transmission Air Breathing Suppressor (TABS) valve to prevent oxygen and water ingestion into their transmissions. Oxygen reacts with high-temperature transmission fluid and can cause oxidation, rust, and corrosion. Automatic transmission fluids using lower quality base oil oxidized more easily than fluids using higher quality base oils. Transmission manufacturers now use smaller, remote mounted, breather vents specially designed to keep out water, but allow a small amount of air movement through the breather as necessary.

=== Sealed ATF Containers ===
Any automatic transmission fluid will last longer if it comes from an unopened container. Experts advise that containers storing automatic transmission fluid (ATF) be sealed; if exposed to the atmosphere, ATF may absorb moisture and potentially cause shift concerns. Experts have also advised that, when performing repairs on ATF-equipped transmissions, fresh ATF be used when refilling the transmission, and have warned not to reuse ATF.

=== Example Maintenance Schedule ===
Base Stock Oil Categories for Ford ATF based upon timeline of availability vs. fluid life under "Normal" driving
API BaseStock Oil	Miles
1949 Group 1	5,000
1950 Group 1	10,000
1959 Group 1	15,000
1959 Group 1	15,000
1960 Group 1	15,000
1967 Group 1*	30,000
1972 Group 1*	30,000
1974 Group 1*	30,000
1981 Group 1*	30,000
1987 Group 1*	30,000
1996 Group 2+	100,000
2001 Group 3	150,000
2014 Group 3+	150,000
*Hydrotreated Group 1

Lifetime automatic transmission fluids made from higher-quality base oil and an additive package are more chemically stable, less reactive, and do not experience oxidation as easily as lower-quality fluids made from lower-quality base oil and an additive package. Therefore, higher-quality transmission fluids can last a long time in normal driving conditions (Typically 100,000 miles (160,000 km) or more).

The definition of 'Lifetime Fluid" differs from transmission manufacturer to transmission manufacturer. Always consult the vehicle maintenance guide for the proper service interval for the fluid in your transmission and your driving conditions.

Chevrolet Colorado Example: According to the Scheduled Maintenance Guide a 2018 Chevrolet Colorado with "Lifetime Fluid" could have two different fluid service intervals depending upon how the vehicle is driven:

=== 1. Normal Driving ===
- Carry passengers and cargo within recommended limits on the Tire and Loading Information label
- Driven on reasonable road surfaces within legal driving limits.

=== 2. Severe Driving ===
- Mainly driven in heavy city traffic in hot weather
- Mainly driven in hilly or mountainous terrain
- Frequently towing a trailer
- Used for high-speed or competitive driving
- Used for taxi, police, or delivery service.

Under "Severe" driving conditions, replace automatic transmission fluid and filter every 45,000 mi (72,420 km)

== Aftermarket Automatic Transmission Fluids ==
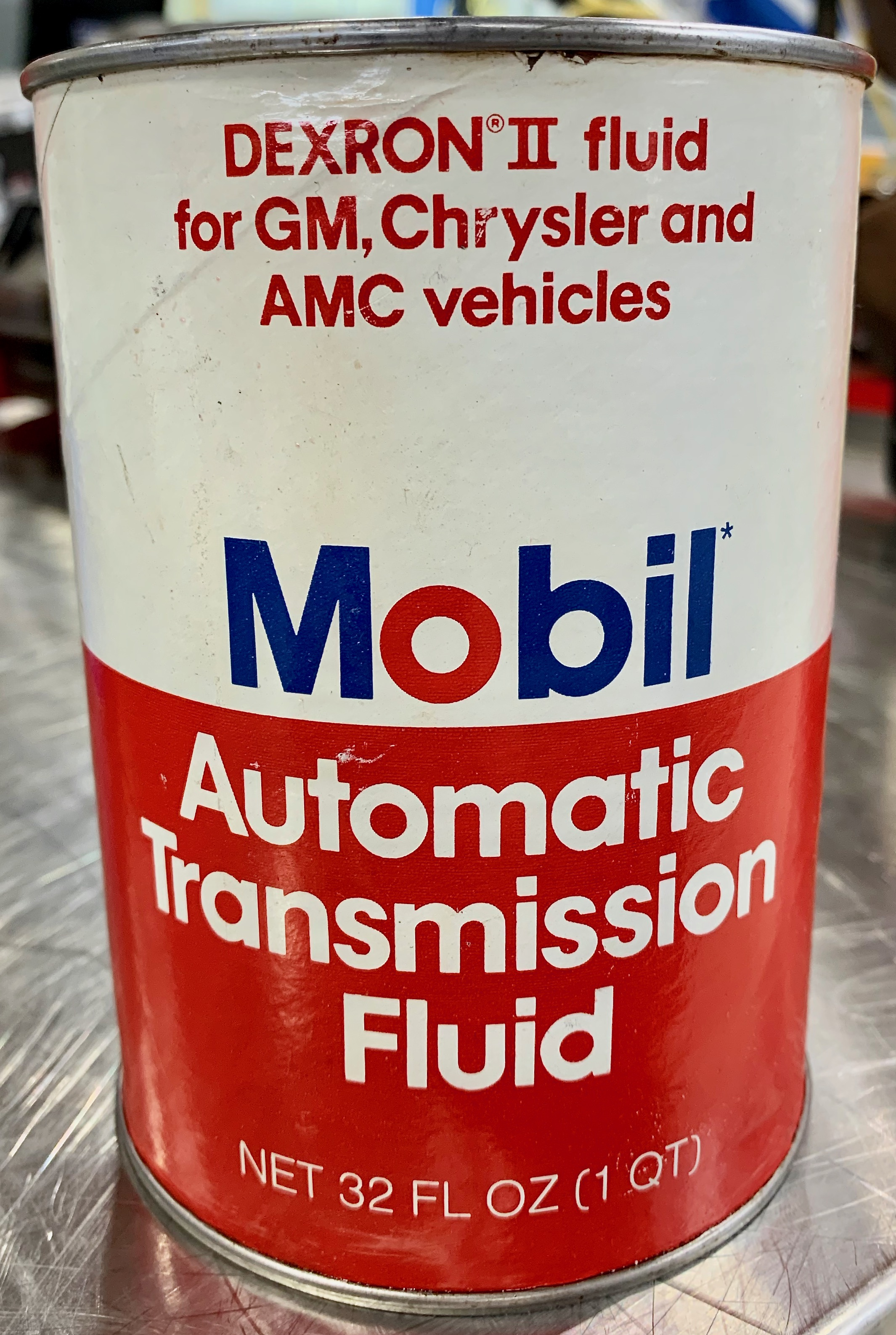
1976 Licensed Mobil Dexron II(D) for GM, Chrysler, and AMC Vehicles

Since the late 1940s, the oil aftermarket has produced both licensed and non-licensed formulations of automatic transmission fluids (ATF). Today, aftermarket fluids asserted by their manufacturers to be compatible for use in various brands of automatic transmissions continue to be sold under names such as Multi-Purpose and Multi-Vehicle fluids. Non-licensed fluids are typically less expensive; these fluids are not regulated or endorsed by the vehicle manufacturer for use in their transmissions. Vehicle manufacturer-approved and licensed fluids must have the license number printed on the product information label of the container or the container housing. Non-licensed fluids do not show a license number. Make sure the fluid to be installed into a transmission matches the recommended fluid in the specifications section of the vehicle's owner's manual.

Use of non-OEM fluids can void a vehicle's warranty.

=== Mislabeled or Misleading Labeling on ATF Containers ===
ATF which has been mislabeled, has misleading labeling, or is fraudulently bottled as another product is an ongoing problem. Some of these fluids have led to multiple transmission failures. The three organizations shown below are trying to stop this problem in the United States.

1. United States Laws: The U.S. Department of Commerce, National Institute of Standards and Technology (NIST), Handbook 130 2019 Edition, contains Uniform Laws and Regulations in the Areas of Legal Metrology and Fuel Quality. Section IV.G.3.14 defines laws regulating the Labeling and Identification of Transmission Fluid. Paragraph IV.G.3.14.1.1. Container Labeling. reads The label on a container of transmission fluid shall not contain any information that is false or misleading.
2. California Laws: The State of California has developed additional Laws in an attempt to prevent mislabeled and misleading labelling. Statutes: California Business and Professions Code, Division 5, Chapters 6, 14, 14.5, and 15. Regulations: California Code of Regulation, Title 4, Division 9, Chapters 6 and 7.
3. American Petroleum Institute (API) Monitoring: The American Petroleum Institute (API) maintains a list of invalid labelling of petroleum products. This real-time list includes motor oils and ATF.

According to a 2017 Lubes'n'Greases article by lubricants consultant Jack Zakarian, nearly all U.S. states follow NIST Handbook 130, which the article reports as stating in Section 2.14 that automatic transmission fluids "shall meet the latest automotive manufacturers' recommended requirements for those transmissions"; an ATF cannot be sold unless its label indicates that it meets at least one transmission specification. The article reports that the service-fill market relies overwhelmingly on multi-vehicle fluids described as "suitable for use", while most OEM transmission fluid specifications are not publicly available. State auditors interpret Handbook 130 to mean that an ATF must fully meet all OEM specifications listed on its label and product data sheet, and enforcement inspections increased in the years before 2017, with a number of ATFs removed from sale because of their label language.

At a panel discussion held by SAE International's Technical Committee 3 (TC-3) on a possible minimum performance standard for service-fill ATF, Roy Fewkes, a consultant who had chaired GM's ATF & Gear Oil Approval Committee, said that a "cover-all" ATF specification is impossible to achieve. Joanna Johnson, a consultant to the Automotive Oil Change Association (AOCA), said there was no evidence of equipment damage or malfunction from multi-vehicle ATF provided by reputable suppliers, and cited AOCA data showing that OEM-approved fluid costs on average 168 percent more than typical multi-vehicle products. According to Zakarian, the TC-3 proposal was "not to replace the OEM factory fill fluid", but to help in selecting a service-fill ATF when the OEM fluid is not available or not desired.

== See also ==
- GM DEXRON automatic transmission fluids
- Ford MERCON automatic transmission fluids
- Chrysler automatic transmission fluids (ATF+)
