= Chrysler automatic transmission fluids =

Automatic transmission fluid specifications issued by Chrysler

Chrysler automatic transmission fluids are the automatic transmission fluid (ATF) specifications, written as Chrysler Material Standards (MS), that Chrysler and its successor companies, including DaimlerChrysler and FCA US, have issued for their automatic transmissions and transaxles, together with the Mopar-branded fluids sold to meet them. Chrysler's Fluid Drive couplings used a special mineral oil, Mopar Fluid Drive Fluid, and its first fully automatic transmission, the PowerFlite, used "Automatic Transmission Fluid Type A". A 1968 review in Texaco's Lubrication described Chrysler's own MS-3256 and MS-4228 specifications, which a 2018 Petroleum Quality Institute of America chart dates to 1964 and 1966. Mopar ATF+, ATF+2 and ATF+3 were "Type 7176" fluids meeting MS-7176, and Mopar ATF+4 meets MS-9602. In 2003 the Independent Lubricant Manufacturers Association complained to the U.S. Federal Trade Commission about DaimlerChrysler's handling of ATF+4 supply, and in 2005 Chrysler began licensing other companies to make and sell ATF+4. Some later Chrysler vehicles use transmissions from JATCO, Aisin and ZF, with Mopar fluids labeled for those transmissions.

== Fluid Drive and early transmissions ==
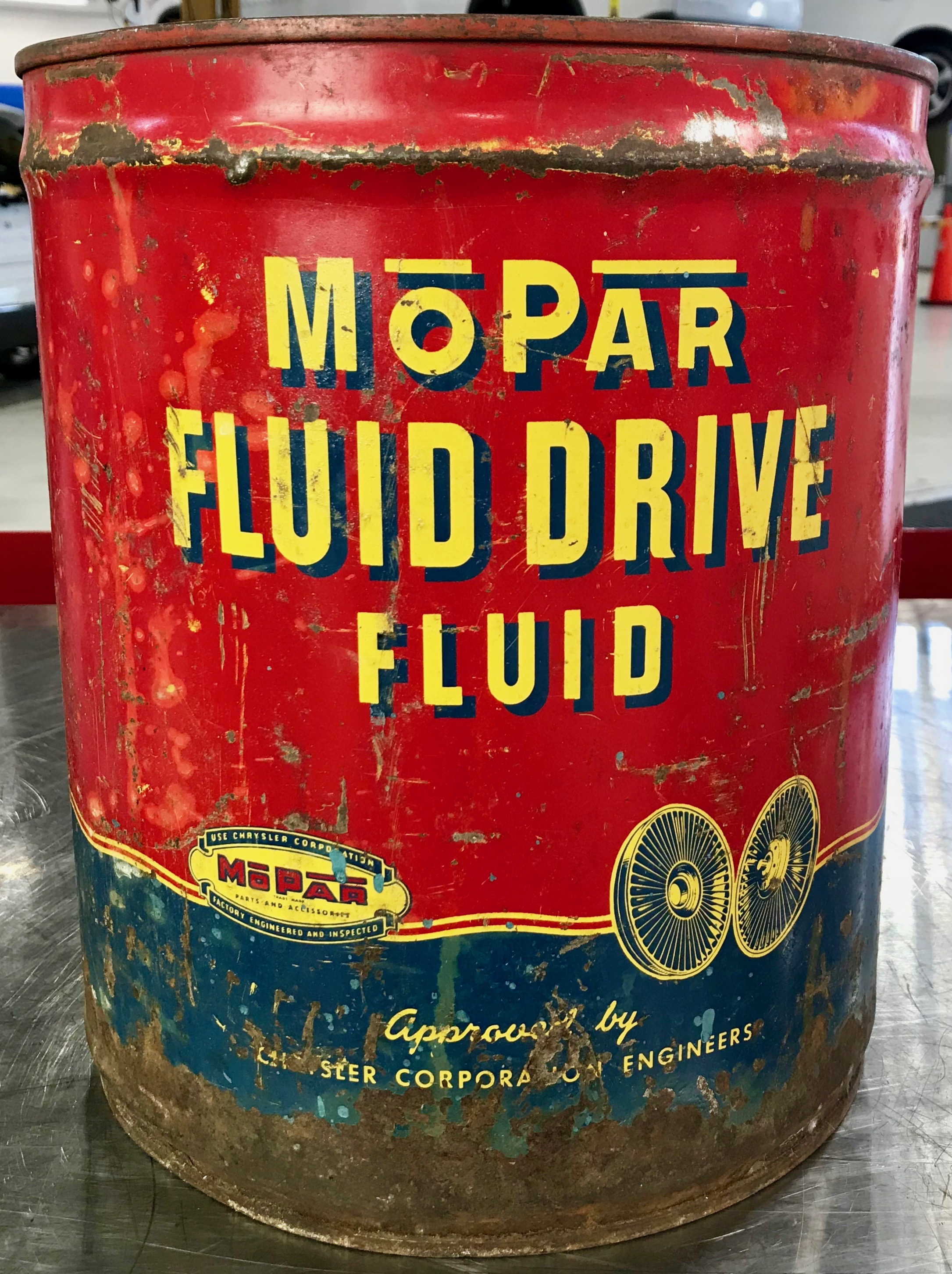
Mopar Fluid Drive Fluid can

Chrysler introduced Fluid Drive, a fluid coupling placed ahead of a conventional transmission, on its 1939 Custom Imperial Eights. In August 1939 Fortune described the coupling's "oil pocket" as needing "only about a half-pint replenishment a year". In a February 1940 booklet, Chrysler said that a European manufacturer had been the first to use a fluid flywheel, that its engineers had worked on a Fluid Drive unit from 1932 to 1937, and that the first application of a fluid coupling to passenger cars in the United States "was made late in 1938", when Chrysler introduced Fluid Drive as standard equipment on the 1939 Custom Imperial. Fluid Drive was optional on Imperial models that year; for 1940 it was standard on the Crown Imperial and optional on the Saratoga, New Yorker and Traveler. The booklet said the unit held two gallons of a special oil "developed exclusively for Fluid Drive" to withstand extremes of temperature. Chrysler engineering test cars had never needed an oil change; only a periodic level check was needed for slight seepage, and the unit would ordinarily need "considerably less than half a pint after a year of hard service". Because the unit was sealed, no air or oxygen could reach the oil to break it down. The booklet contrasted this with the Hydra-Matic, in which "the same oil that is used in the transmission operates the fluid coupling". A separate, undated Chrysler booklet describing a working model shown to World's Fair visitors stated that the coupling housing was "filled with a special oil of low viscosity to about four-fifths of its capacity". In 1954 Texaco's Lubrication magazine described the fluid, Mopar Fluid Drive Fluid, as "a special highly refined straight mineral oil" with a viscosity of about 185 SUS at 100 °F. Because the coupling was essentially sealed, the fluid did not need to be drained, and the level-check recommendation had been extended from 2,500 miles to 15,500 miles and finally to "never", the life of the car.

From 1941 Chrysler paired the coupling with semi-automatic four-speed gearboxes: the vacuum-shifted M-3, used in the Chrysler Vacamatic and De Soto Simplimatic of 1941 and 1942, and, from 1946, hydraulically shifted gearboxes sold under names including Dodge Gyromatic, De Soto Tip-Toe Hydraulic Shift and Chrysler Prestomatic and Fluid Matic. According to Lubrication, the four-speed gearbox ran winter and summer on three pints of SAE 10W motor oil, and the hydraulically shifted versions were lubricated the same way. The Fluid-Torque Drive and Gyro-Torque Drive transmissions of 1951 to 1953 replaced the coupling with a torque converter. Converters with their own separate fluid system, used in the Chrysler V8 version and some early De Soto models, were filled with Mopar Fluid Drive Fluid; because that fluid was exposed to air in the converter sump, it had to be replaced at regular intervals. The other, "engine-fed" converters used engine crankcase oil and had to be drained separately when the crankcase was drained. The Plymouth Hy-Drive of 1953 and 1954 also had an engine-fed converter, but its three-speed manual gearbox was lubricated separately with SAE 80 gear lubricant.

== Type A and Type A Suffix A ==
The PowerFlite, Chrysler's first fully automatic transmission, was according to Lubrication the first Chrysler transmission to use a single fluid for the torque converter, gearbox and hydraulic controls. It took 10 to 11 quarts of "a fully qualified Automatic Transmission Fluid Type A", which the manufacturer recommended draining and replacing every 20,000 miles.

In 1949 General Motors set up a qualification program for automatic transmission service fluids. Its committee promoted the generic name "Automatic Transmission Fluid, Type A" and called the product a "fluid" rather than an "oil" in the hope of discouraging the substitution of engine oil. The Armour Research Foundation, part of the Illinois Institute of Technology, was engaged to help qualify fluids, and each qualified fluid was assigned an Armour Qualification (AQ) number that appeared on its container. The first numbers, AQ-ATF-101 and AQ-ATF-102, were assigned in 1949 to the two fluids then in use, and the last number granted in 1955 was AQ-ATF-482. A Mopar Type "A" quart can (part no. 1843314) states that the fluid was approved under Armour Institute Qualification No. AQ-ATF 600 for automatic transmissions and power steering units specifying Type "A" fluid; the number is also embossed on the lid. By 1956 Type A fluid was recommended by every U.S. passenger car manufacturer, and C. M. Heinen of Chrysler called it "a remarkable material". General Motors issued the first Type A automatic transmission fluid specification in 1949, followed by Type A Suffix A in 1957, which remained in effect until early 1967. Fluids meeting the Suffix A specification were identified by the letter A after the AQ-ATF number. According to a 2004 SAE reference book, GM's Type A (1949) and Type A Suffix A (1957) were initially the standard specifications, but Ford in 1960 and Chrysler in 1964 issued their own.

Type A

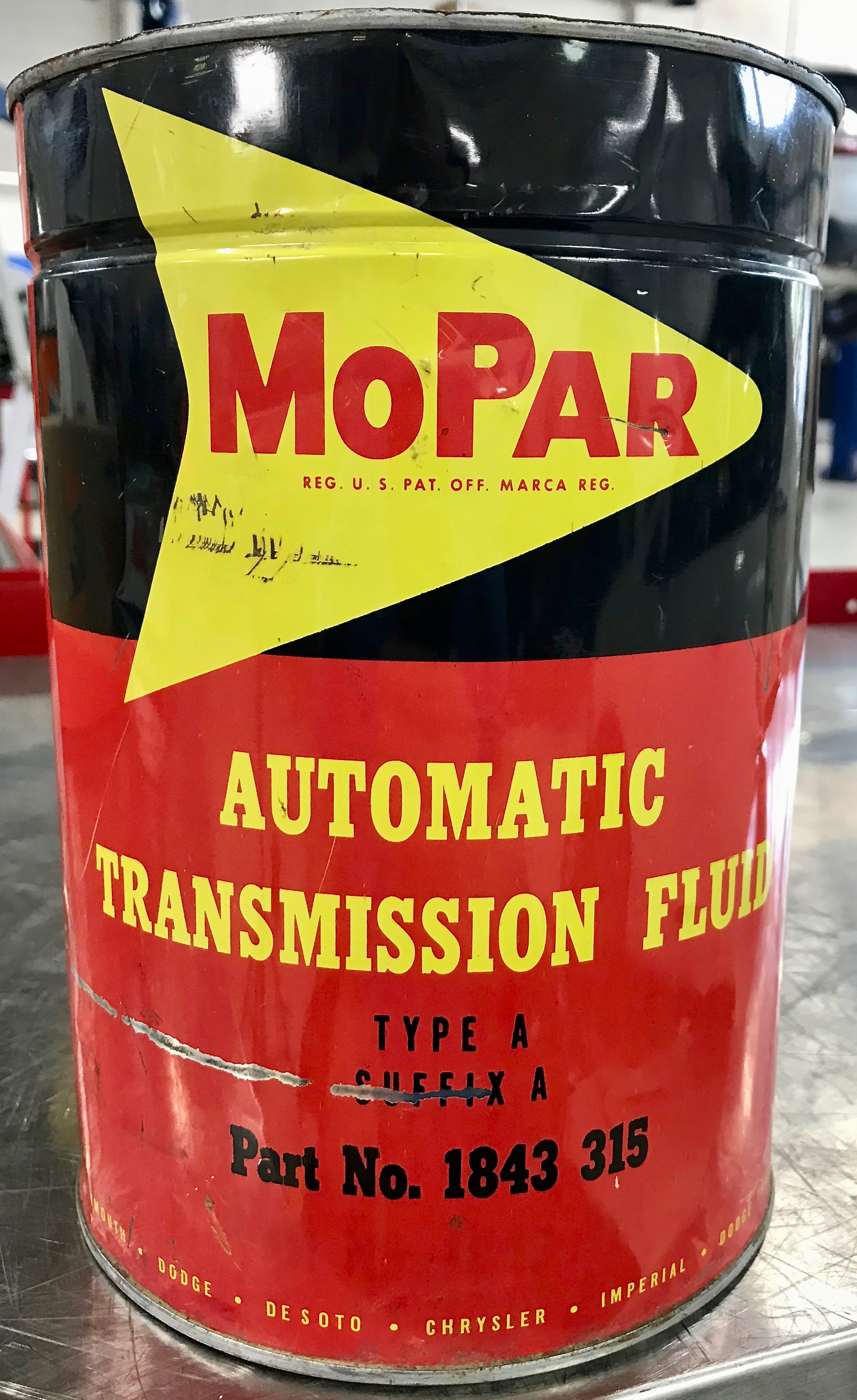
Type A Suffix A

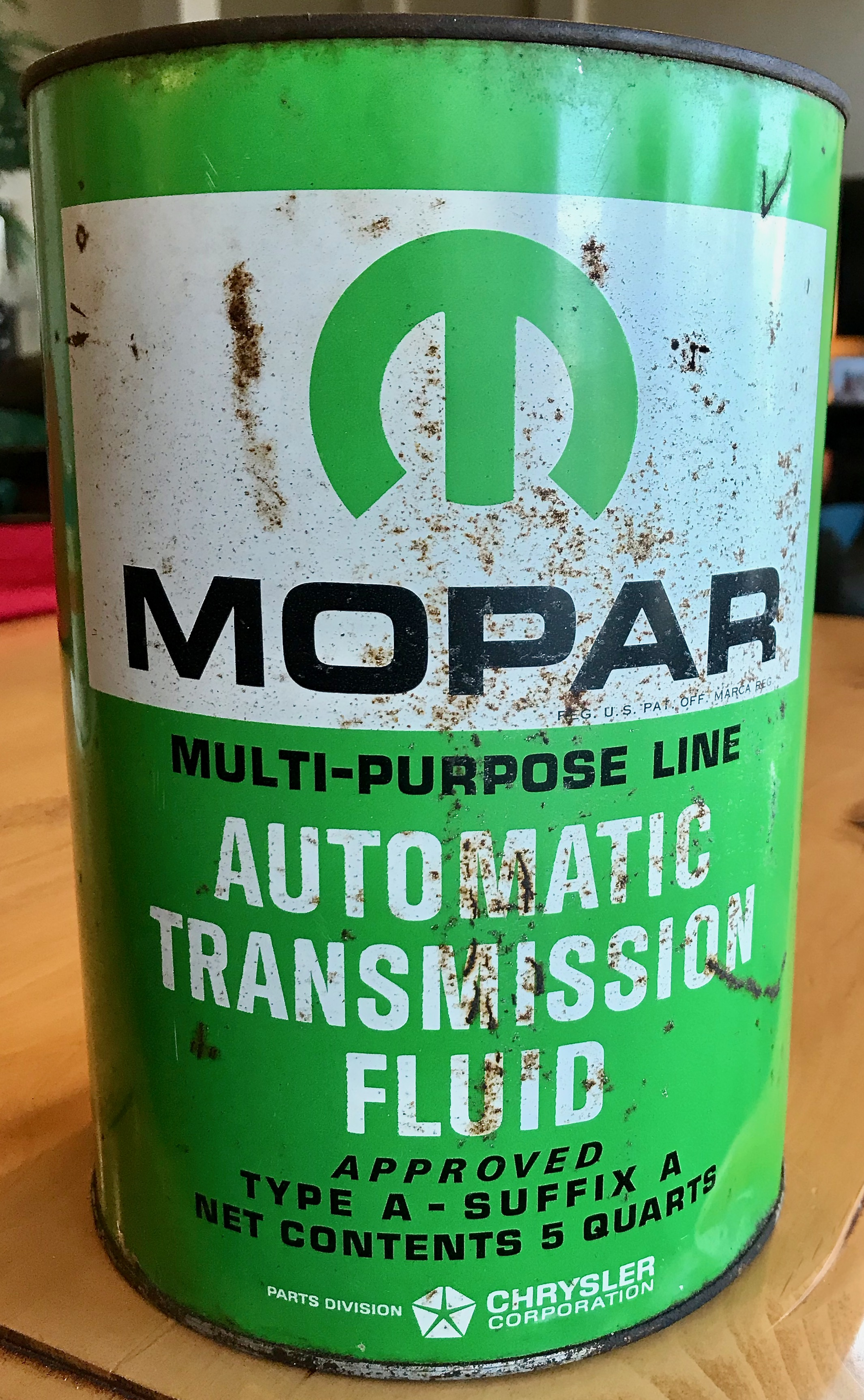
Type A Suffix A, 5 qt

Mopar Automatic Transmission Fluid (Type "A") can, part no. 1843314. Mopar Type "A" Suffix "A" automatic transmission fluid can, part no. 1843315. Mopar "Multi-Purpose Line" Type "A" Suffix "A" automatic transmission fluid, five-quart can.

== MS-3256 and MS-4228 ==
In 1964, Chrysler's factory-fill fluid was still a Type A Suffix A fluid MS-3256. A new fluid specification MS-4228 was developed to improve low-temperature viscosity. The new fluid was described as having the smooth-shifting properties of a Type A fluid but with a lower Brookfield viscosity of 2,300 centipoise at −20 °F, instead of the previous fluid's specification of 7,000 cP maximum. The new fluid became the factory-fill fluid in 1966, allowing vehicles to start and shift properly in cold weather. The specification also improved oxidation resistance through a special bench oxidation test. Chrysler developed a 400-hour cycling test to measure thermal and oxidation stability. Chrysler and General Motors preferred fluids with a lower static coefficient of friction than dynamic. Ford preferred the opposite. DEXRON or AQ-A (Type A Suffix A) fluids were listed as recommended service fluids for 1968 and older Chrysler cars.

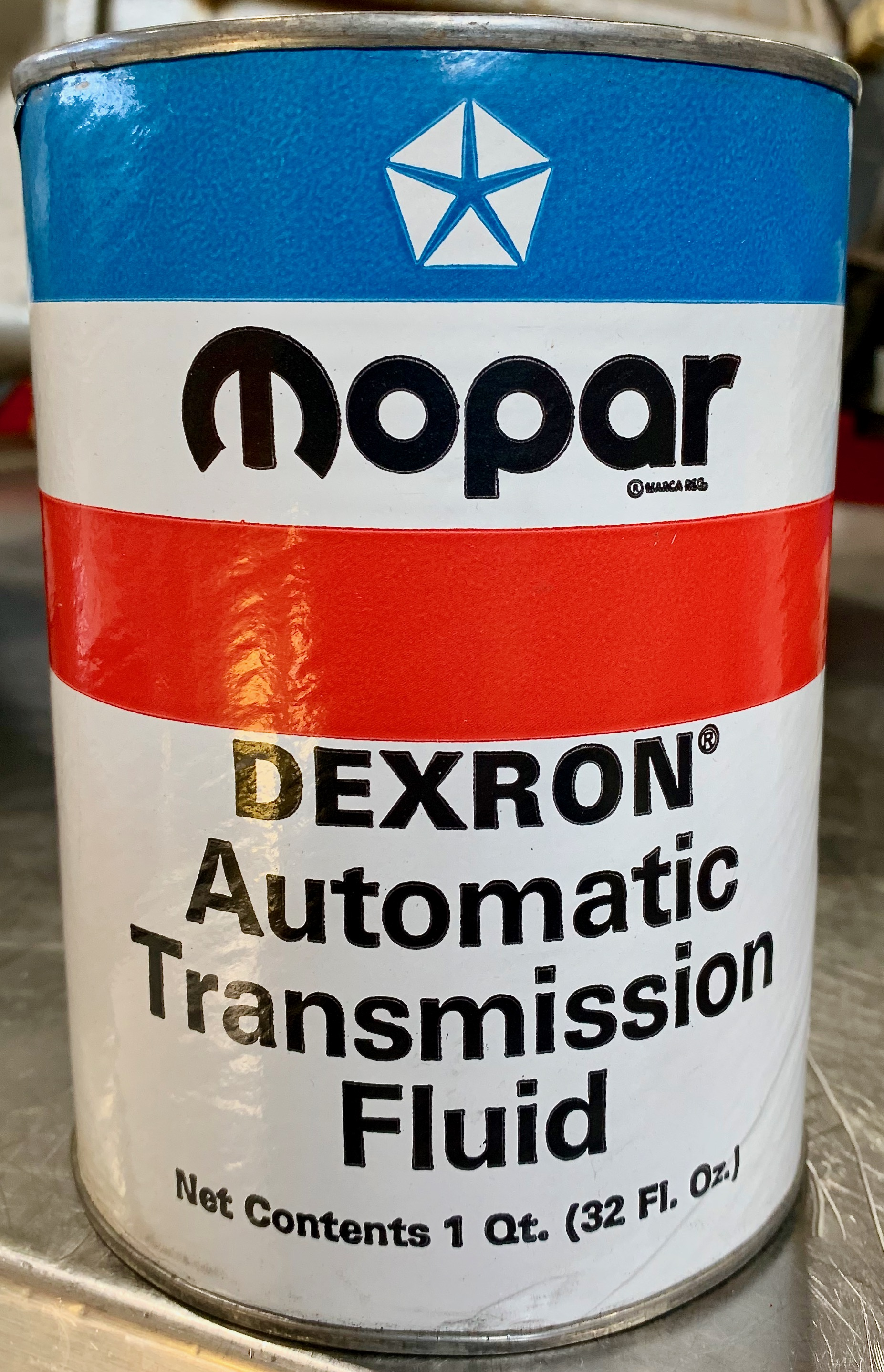
Mopar Dexron

Mopar Dexron II

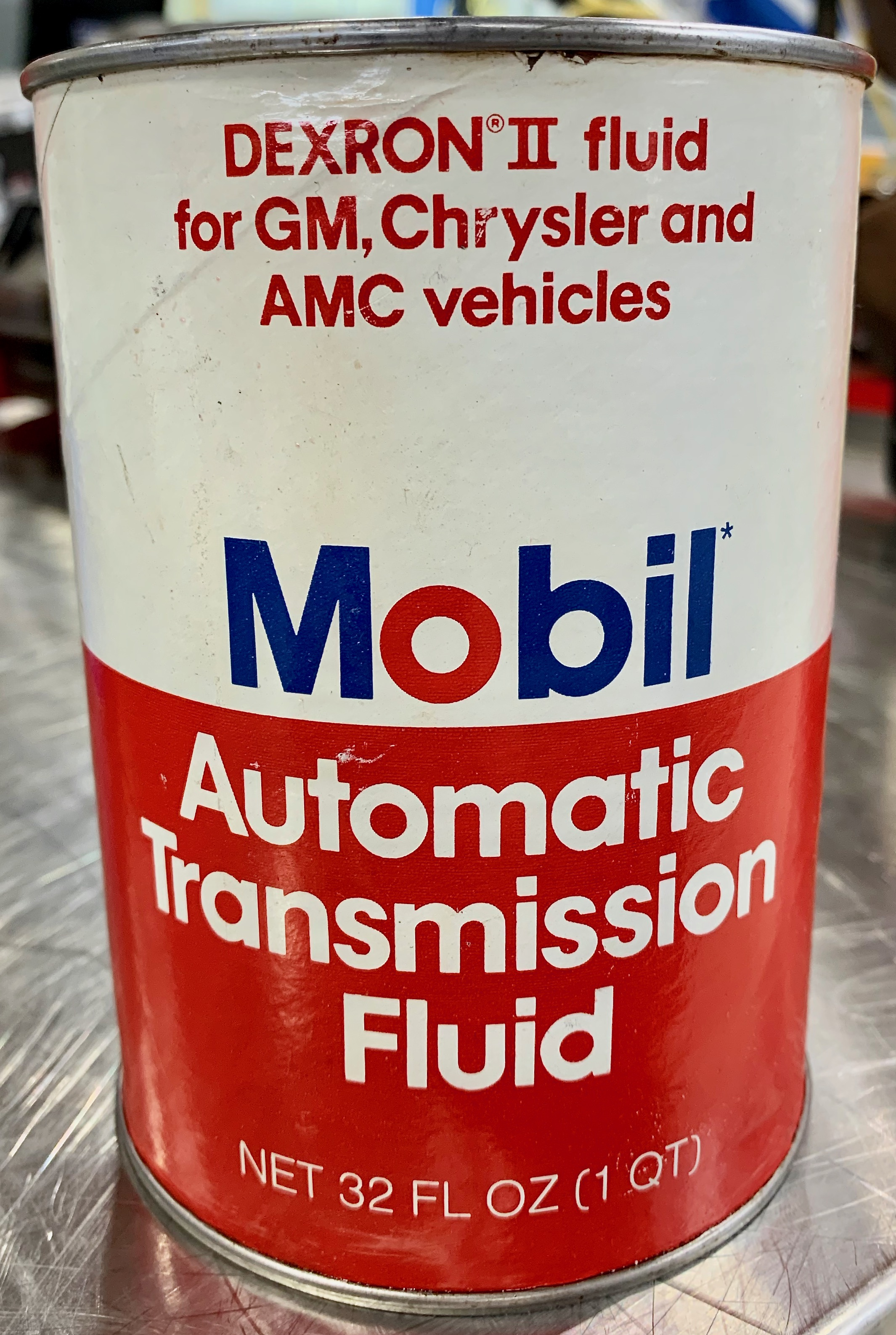
Mobil Dexron II

Mopar Dexron automatic transmission fluid quart can; Mopar Dexron II automatic transmission fluid quart can; Mobil Automatic Transmission Fluid, labeled "Dexron II fluid for GM, Chrysler and AMC vehicles".

Chrysler engineers, in a 1968 paper, cited that smaller torque converters used with the TorqueFlite transmission, larger engines, and lower numerical axle ratios raised transmission operating temperatures, together with higher-speed driving, trailer towing, and longer warranty coverage, as reasons for the new, stricter oxidation-stability and shear-stability requirements. Both Chrysler fluid standards, MS-3256 and MS-4228, required that the fluids be dyed a distinctive red color.

== MS-7176: ATF+, ATF+2 and ATF+3 ==
A Mopar-branded "ATF+ Type 7176" quart container, with a 1986 Chrysler Motors Corporation copyright line, states that the fluid meets Chrysler Material Standard MS-7176.

The same book describes MS-7176 as "very similar to DEXRON II", with DEXRON II specified as an alternative when the Chrysler fluid is not available.

Later Mopar fluids kept the 7176 type number. A one-gallon Mopar ATF+3 Type 7176 container states that the fluid replaces ATF+ Type 7176 and ATF+2 Type 7176 and meets Chrysler Standard MS-7176E.

A 1998 technical paper by Chrysler, Texaco and Lubrizol engineers identified MS-7176D as the Chrysler factory-fill specification used before 1997. In June 1997 ATF+3, meeting MS-7176E, replaced the MS-7176D fluid as Chrysler's factory fill; the change adopted a more shear-stable viscosity index improver that had been developed during work on a successor fluid. The paper's reference list dates Chrysler's Engineering Specification MS-7176 Change E to 14 May 1997.

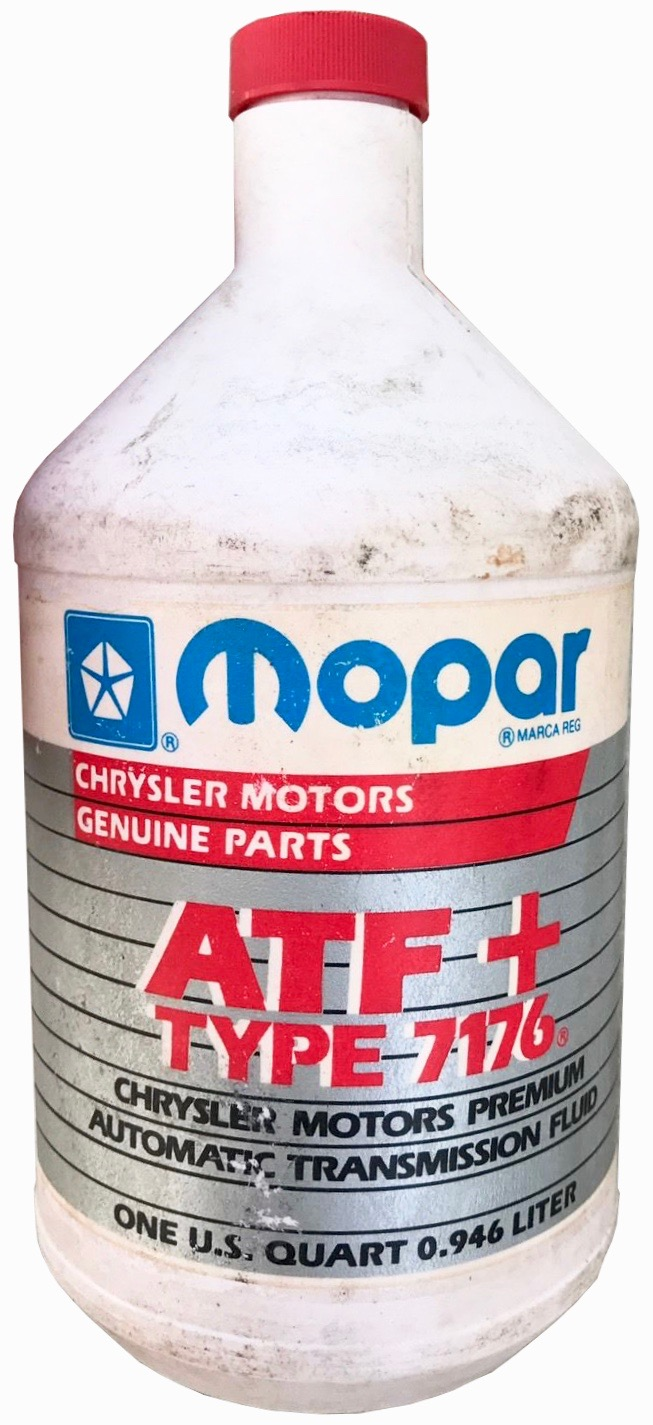
ATF+ Type 7176, front

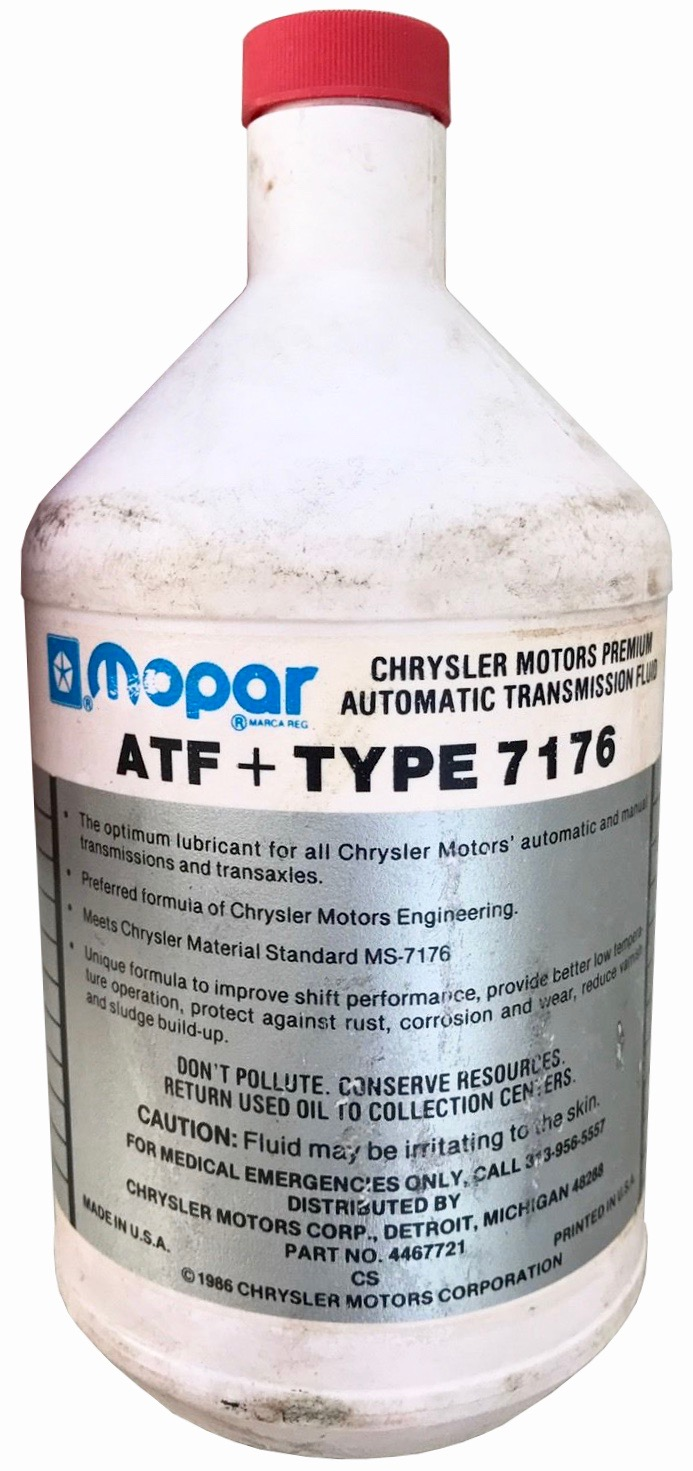
ATF+ Type 7176, back

ATF+3 gallon, front

ATF+3 gallon, back

Mopar ATF+ Type 7176 quart bottle; its back label states that the fluid meets Chrysler Material Standard MS-7176. Mopar ATF+3 Type 7176 one-gallon jug, part no. 05010125AA; its back label states that the fluid meets Chrysler Standard MS-7176E.

== MS-9602: ATF+4 ==
DaimlerChrysler introduced the MS-9602 specification, sold as Mopar ATF+4, in 1998. SAE's information report on passenger-car automatic transmission fluids lists MS-9602 with an October 1998 date. According to the same chapter, when MS-9602 was introduced in 1998 it required Group III or higher-grade base oils to meet its low-temperature limit of 10,000 cP or less at −40 °C, and it is one of the specifications that names a particular additive package. According to the paper presenting the fluid, Chrysler began limited development work early in 1989 and a full-time program in 1994, aiming for a "fill-for-life" fluid. Its partners were Texaco, which supplied a Group III extra-high-viscosity-index (XHVI) base oil, and Lubrizol, which developed the additive system and a new viscosity modifier. The specification was written alongside the candidate fluid. Compared with MS-7176E, it extended the aluminum beaker oxidation test from 300 to 500 hours and tightened the used-oil limits. Vehicle testing exceeded two million miles with no fluid drains up to 100,000 miles. A later SAE overview of driveline fluids by authors from BorgWarner, Lubrizol and Afton Chemical noted that MS-9602 required Group III or higher base stocks.

ATF+4 was introduced as a running change in the 2000 model year in Chrysler minivans with the 41TE transaxle: NS models (Town & Country, Caravan and Voyager) built after 10 October 1999 at the Windsor assembly plant and after 18 October 1999 at the St. Louis plant, and GS models (the international-market Chrysler Voyager) built after 8 November 1999. By June 2001 Chrysler was using it as the factory fill for all vehicles with Chrysler automatic transmissions. It recommended ATF+4 for servicing those vehicles, except 1999 and earlier minivans, which were to stay on ATF+3 because of possible torque converter shudder during break-in. The bulletin stated that ATF+4 could be used to top off transmissions containing ATF+2 or ATF+3, but that ATF+2 or ATF+3 should not be added to a transmission filled with ATF+4. The 2018 PQIA chart also shows ATF+4 as back-serviceable for the earlier Chrysler fluids.

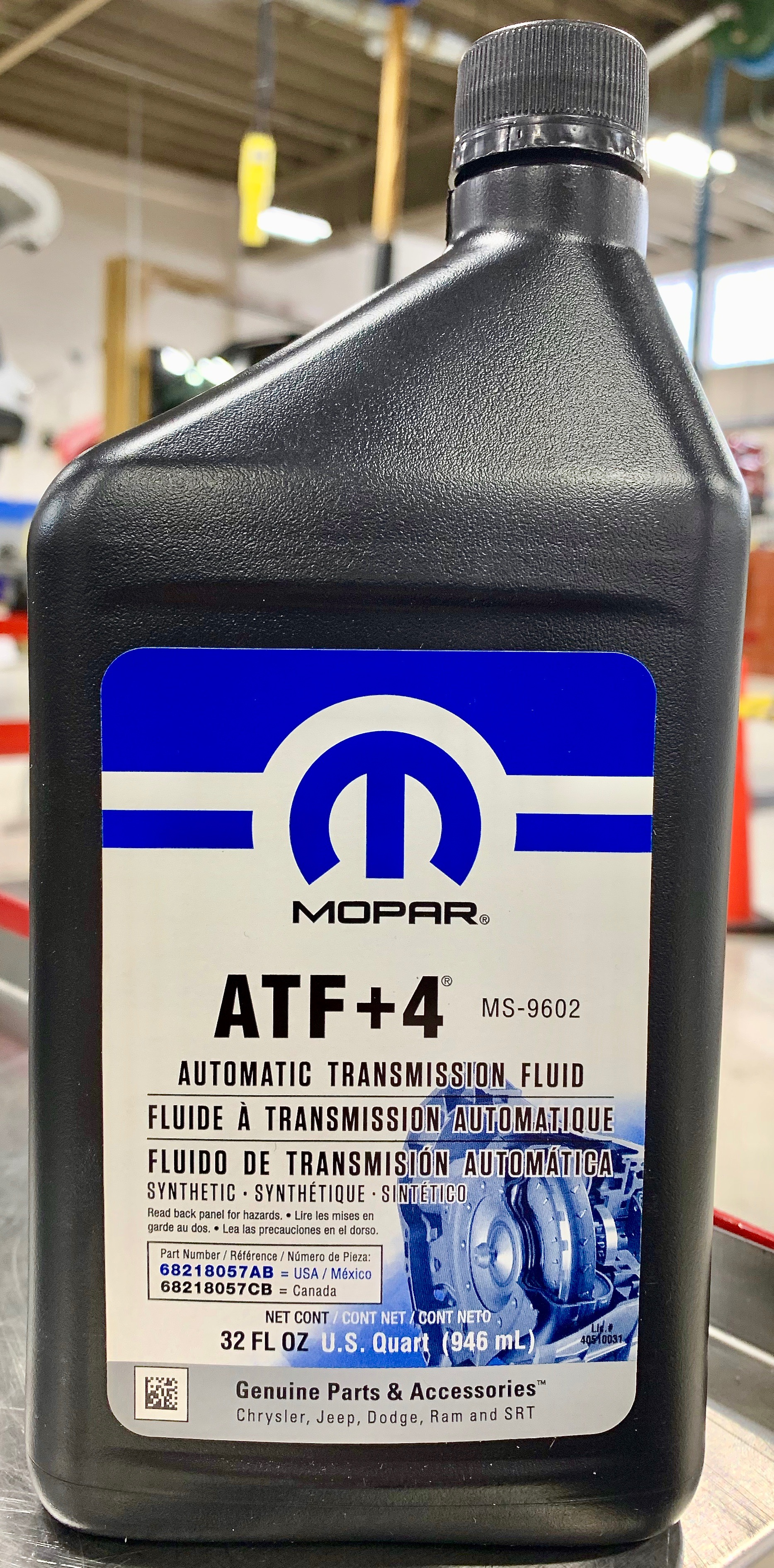
ATF+4, front

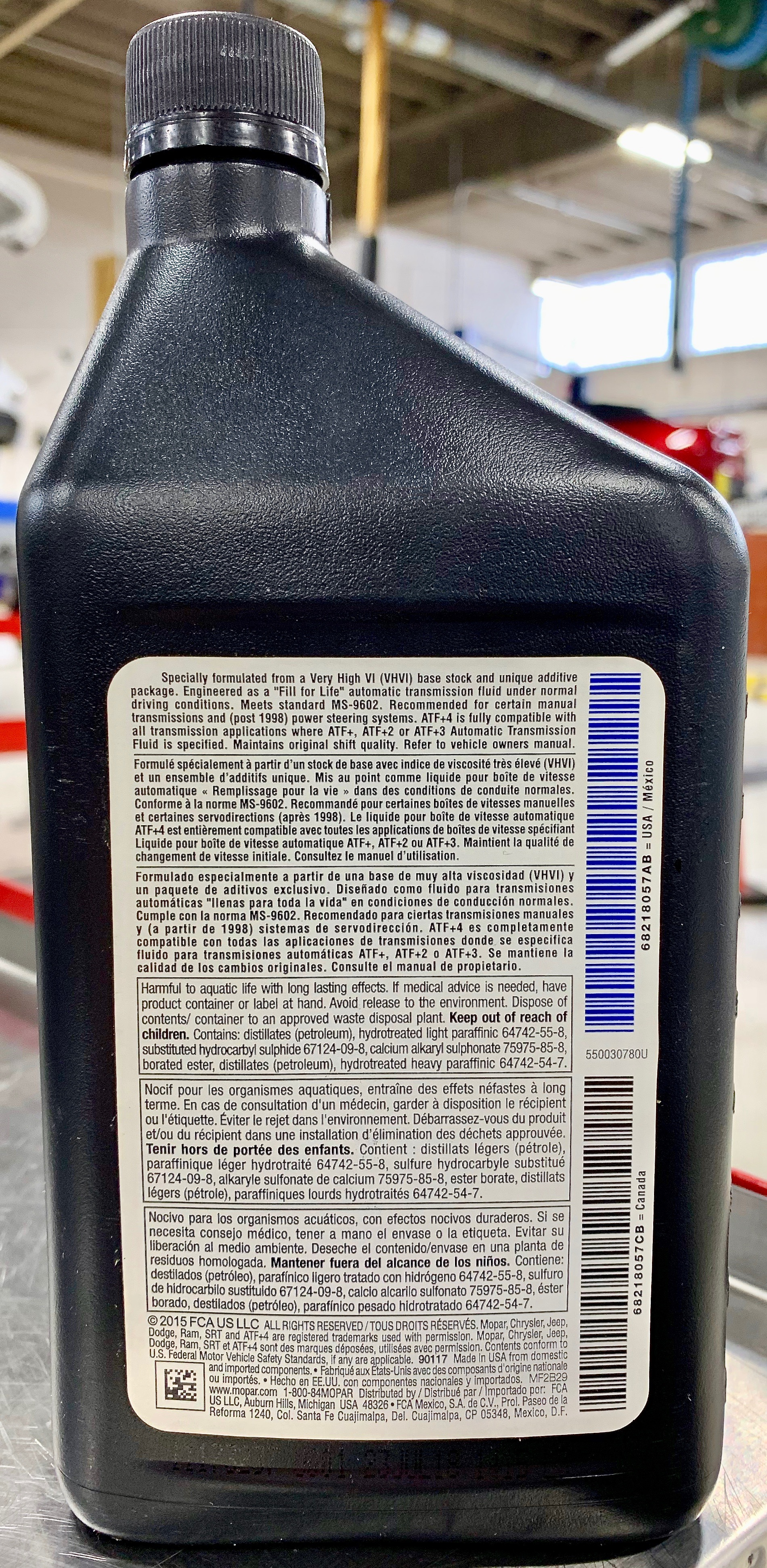
ATF+4, back

Mopar ATF+4 (MS-9602) quart bottle, part no. 68218057AB. The back label states that it meets standard MS-9602 and is compatible with applications that call for ATF+, ATF+2 or ATF+3.

== Supply and licensing ==
In November 2003 the Independent Lubricant Manufacturers Association (ILMA) filed a complaint with the Federal Trade Commission accusing DaimlerChrysler of unfair trade practices over ATF+4. According to the complaint, Lubrizol was the exclusive supplier of the fluid's additive chemistry, and DaimlerChrysler had contracted Petro-Canada and ChevronTexaco to supply the fluid. Independent blenders that had asked for the formula had been refused. ILMA argued that this violated the Magnuson–Moss Warranty Act, and it also objected to dealers being offered bulk ATF+4 only together with bulk Mopar motor oil. ILMA said earlier Chrysler fluid formulas and specifications had been made available to blenders. DaimlerChrysler did not respond to requests for comment. A 2017 Lubes'n'Greases article, summarizing a presentation by ILMA general counsel Jeff Leiter, reported that when ILMA challenged Chrysler's position that only fluids meeting the ATF+4 specification were acceptable for Chrysler transmissions, the FTC did not consider the warranty requirement a violation of the Magnuson–Moss Warranty Act, reasoning that consumers could buy vehicles that did not have Chrysler transmissions.

In August 2005 the Chrysler Group announced that, from 1 September, it would license the trademarked ATF+4 specification for commercial and retail sale. Until then the fluid had been available only through Chrysler dealerships, and Chrysler cited customers' use of unlicensed imitation fluids. By October 2005 four oil companies were licensed to blend ATF+4, and a rebrand licensing program, announced by the Center for Quality Assurance, allowed other marketers to sell licensed fluid under their own brands. In a 2016 trade-press review of the ATF market, consultant Jack Zakarian was reported as listing ATF+4 among the upgrades formulators had to consider between 1996 and 2005, as the number of manufacturer-specific fluids grew.

== Later transmissions ==
Some later Chrysler vehicles use transmissions from other manufacturers with their own fluids. A JATCO continuously variable transmission (CVT) was offered in the 2007 Dodge Caliber, Jeep Compass and Jeep Patriot. Mopar's CVTF+4 fluid label, with a 2007 Chrysler LLC copyright line, describes the fluid as formulated "specifically for the JATCO continuously variable transmission (CVT) used in Chrysler vehicles" and as meeting the Nissan NS-2 specification.

The Aisin AS68RC six-speed automatic, used from 2007 in Dodge Ram chassis-cab trucks from the 3500 series up, required its own fluid, sold in bottles marked "Mopar AS68RC Automatic Transmission Fluid". The AS69RC replaced it for the 2013 Ram 3500 Heavy Duty and chassis-cab models. A later Mopar ASRC quart label, with a 2016 FCA US LLC copyright line, describes the fluid as formulated "for use in AS68RC and AS69RC slip-controlled lock-up automatic transmissions" and recommended "for use in transmissions made by Aisin-Seiki requiring Type T-IV fluids".

ZF's lubricant list for its 8HP eight-speed automatic gives ZF LifeguardFluid 8, with Chrysler oil number 68157995AA as the corresponding Chrysler part. A quart label for Mopar "8&9 Speed ATF" (part no. 68218925AA), with a 2013 Chrysler Group LLC copyright line, describes that fluid as formulated "specifically for the ZF 8HP45 & ZF 9HP45 transmission used in Chrysler vehicles" and as meeting ZF specifications.

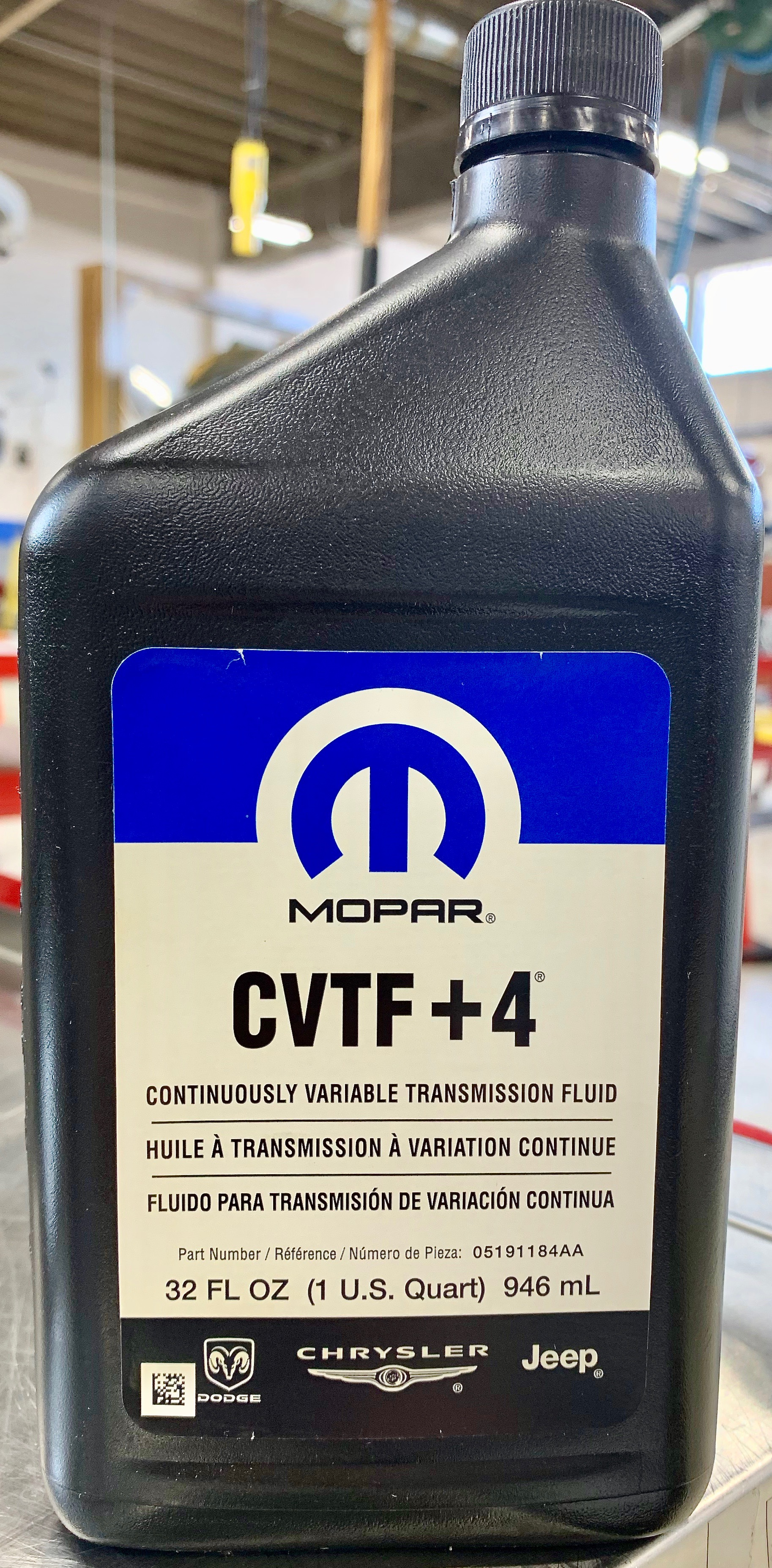
CVTF+4, front

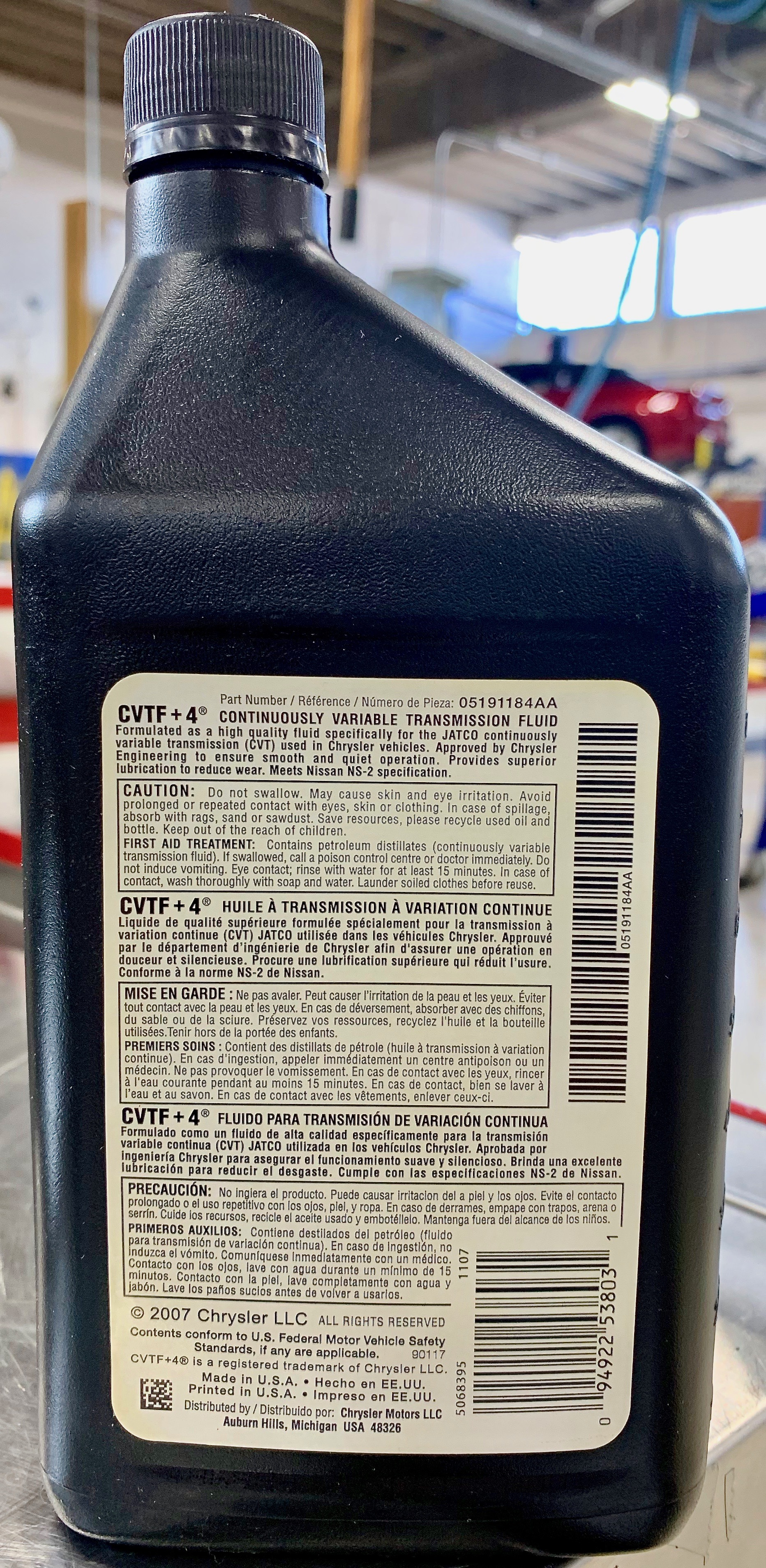
CVTF+4, back

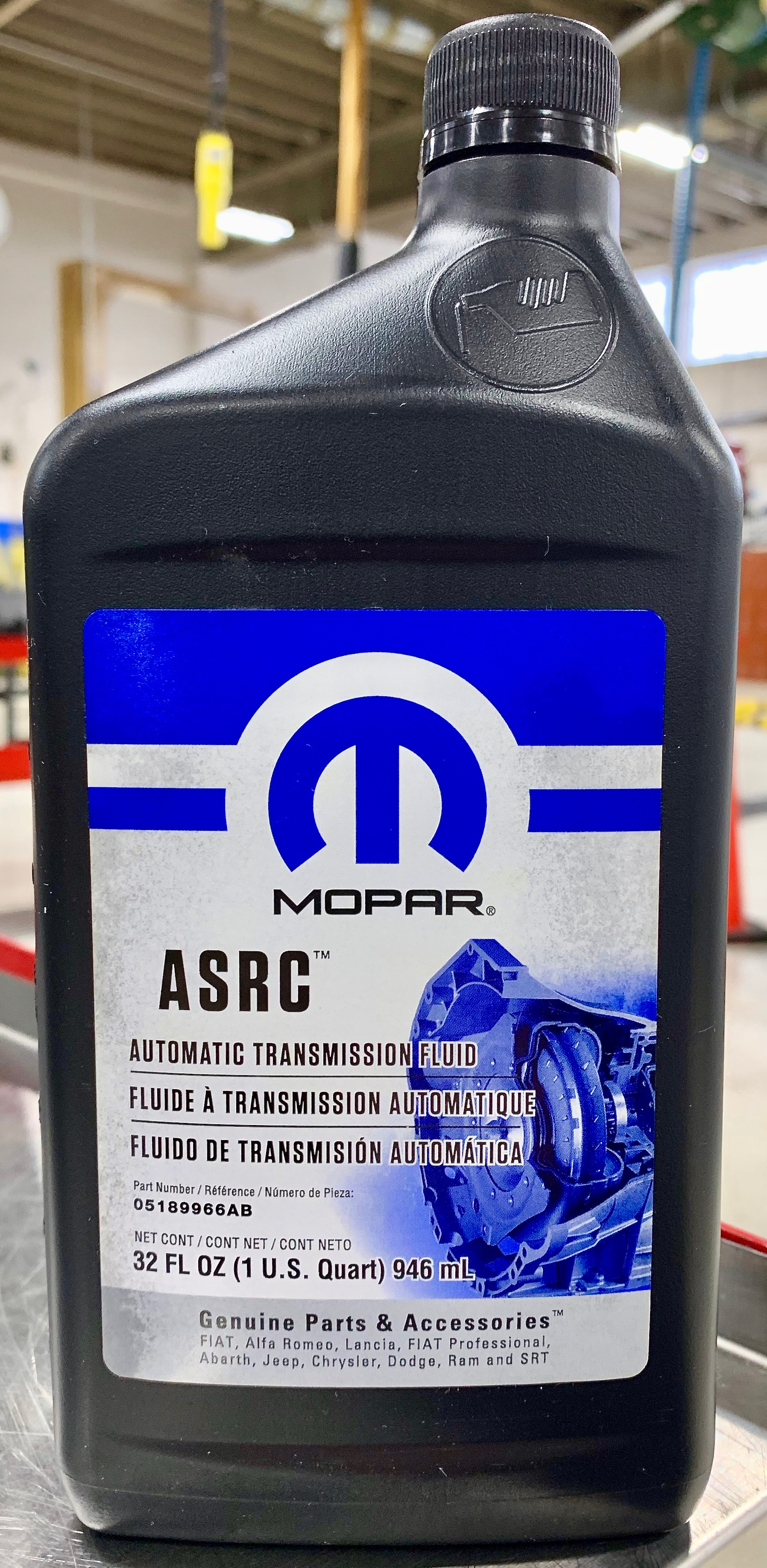
ASRC, front

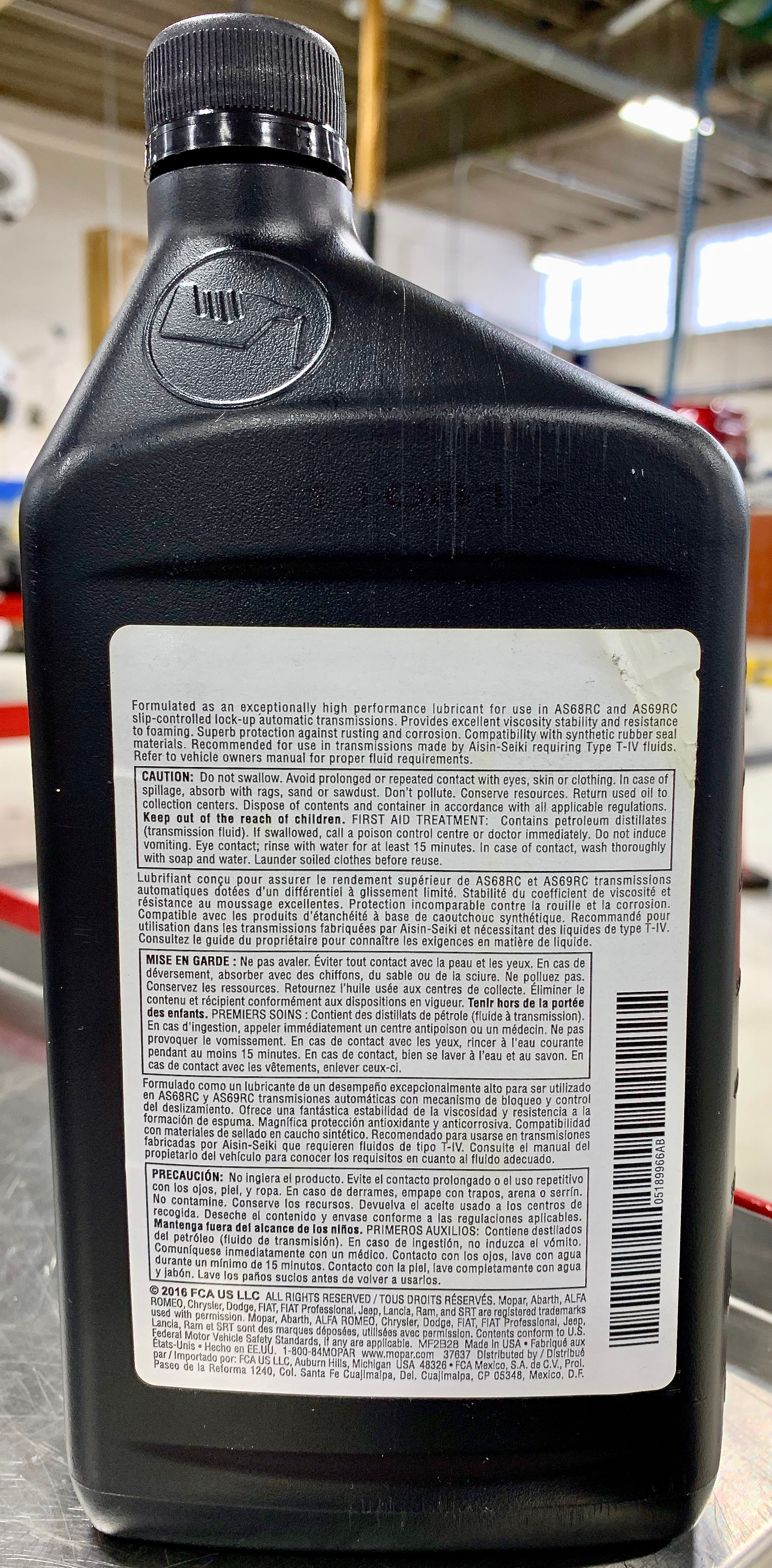
ASRC, back

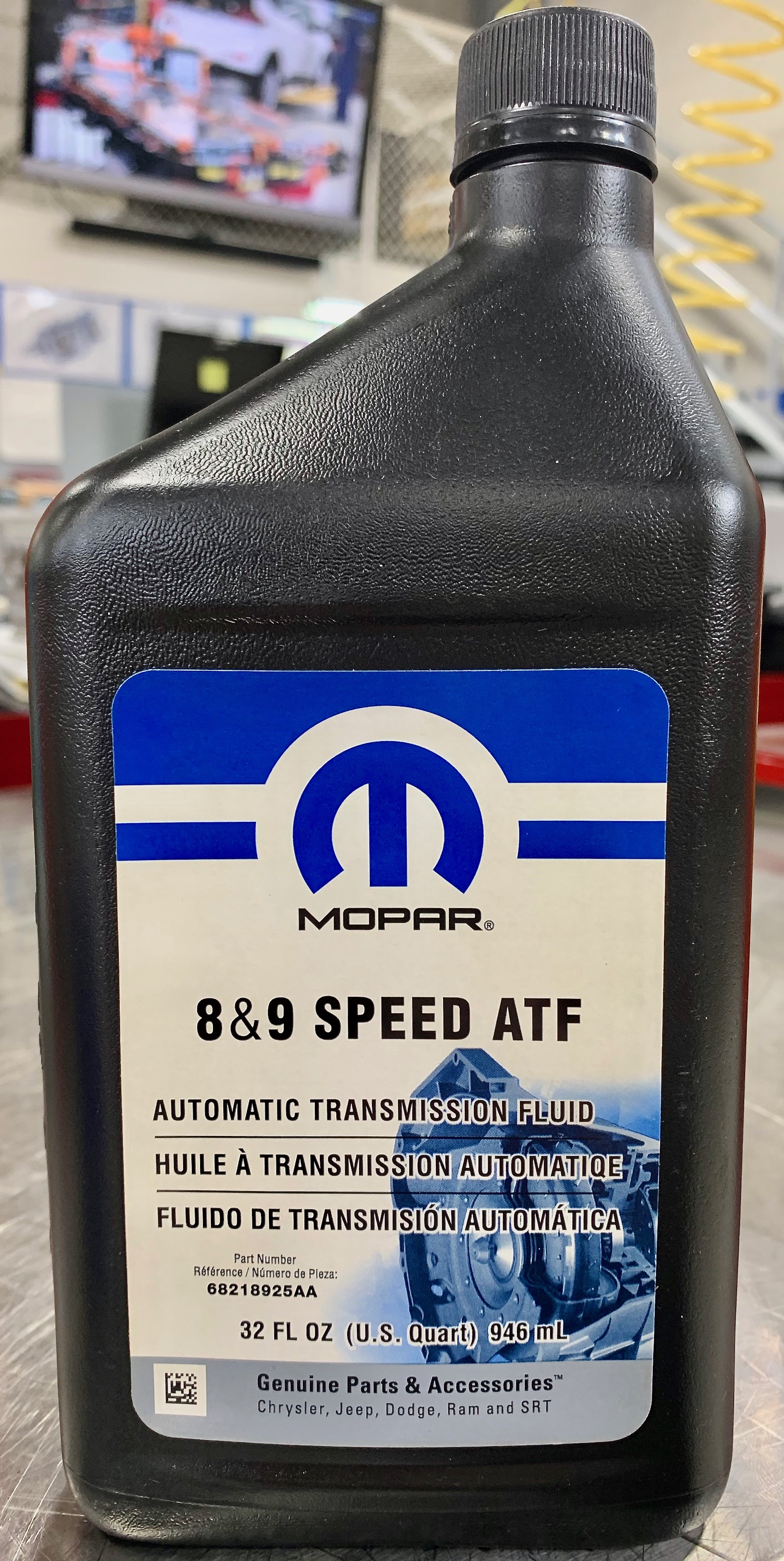
8&9 Speed, front

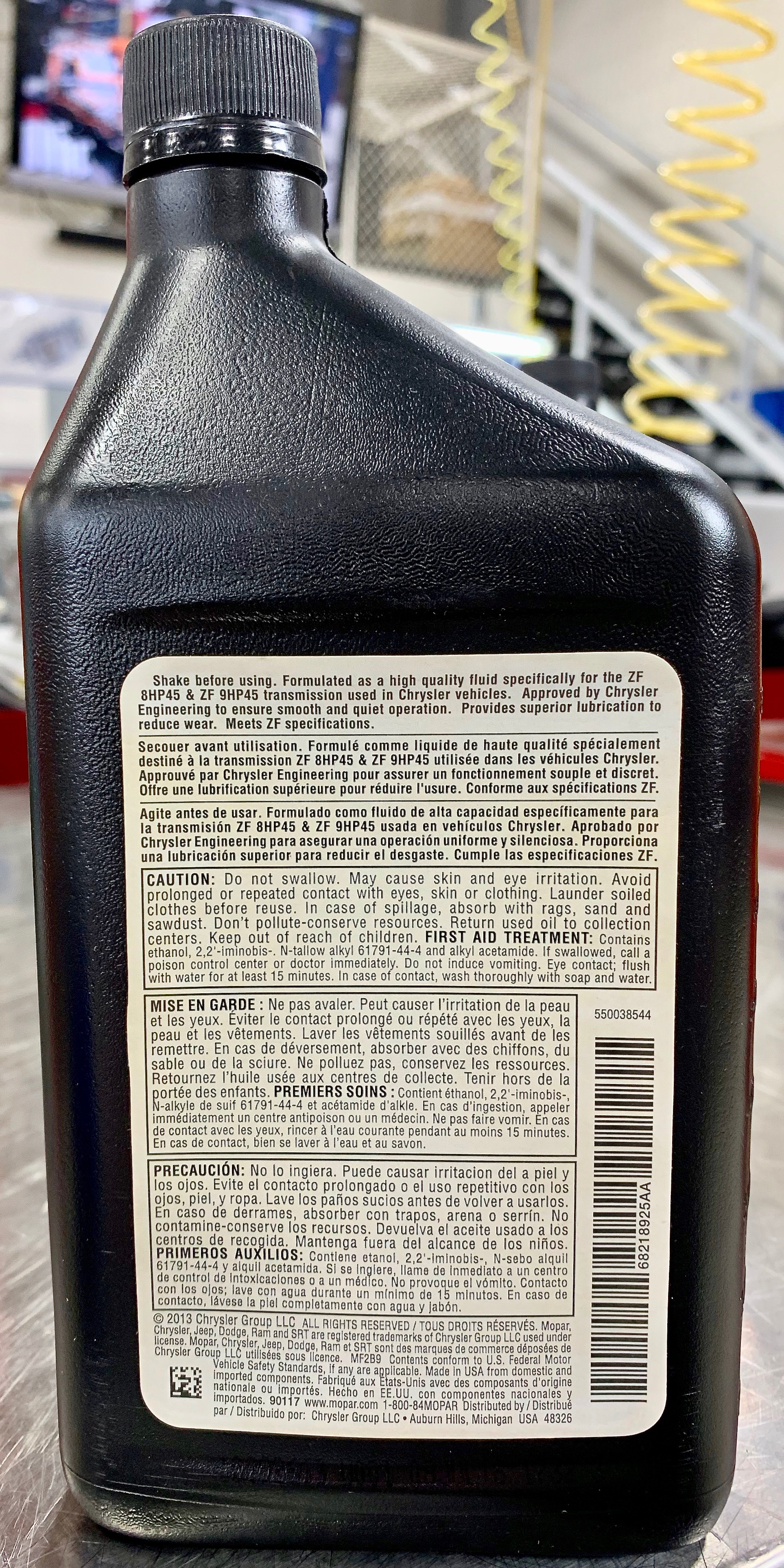
8&9 Speed, back

Mopar CVTF+4 continuously variable transmission fluid; its back label says it is formulated for the JATCO CVT used in Chrysler vehicles and meets Nissan NS-2. Mopar ASRC automatic transmission fluid; its back label names the AS68RC and AS69RC transmissions. Mopar 8&9 Speed ATF; its back label names the ZF 8HP45 and 9HP45 transmissions.

== See also ==
- Automatic transmission fluid
- DEXRON
- MERCON
