= Northeastern Huskies football =

Former college football team of Northeastern University

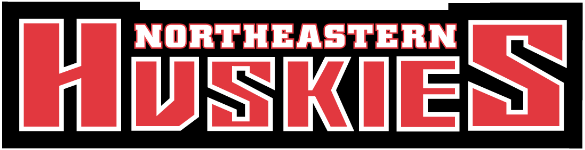
- First season: 1933; 93 years ago
- Last season: 2009; 17 years ago
- Location: Boston, Massachusetts, U.S.
- Stadium: Parsons Field (capacity: 7,000)
- NCAA division: Division I FCS
- Conference: CAA Football
- Colors: Red and black
- All-time record: 289–366–17 (.443)
- Bowl record: 0–1 (.000)

Conference championships
- 1 (2002)
- Rivalries: Boston University Terriers; UMass Minutemen
- Mascot: Paws

The Northeastern Huskies football program were the intercollegiate American football teams for Northeastern University located in Boston. The team competed in the NCAA Division I Football Championship Subdivision (FCS) and were members of CAA Football, the technically separate football arm of what is now the Coastal Athletic Association. (Note: The CAA was known as Colonial Athletic Association before July 2023.) Northeastern participated in football from 1933 to 2009, compiling an all-time record of 289–366–17. Citing sparse attendance, numerous losing seasons and the expense to renovate Parsons Field (its football stadium in neighboring Brookline) to an acceptable standard, the university Board of Trustees voted on November 20, 2009, to end the football program. According to president Joseph E. Aoun, "Leadership requires that we make these choices. This decision allows us to focus on our existing athletic programs".

== Notable former players ==
Among the notable players for Northeastern were:

- Jerome Daniels – Baltimore Ravens and Arizona Cardinals offensive lineman
- Sean Jones – LA Raiders, Green Bay Packers, and Houston Oilers lineman (Super Bowl champion: XXXI)
- Darin Jordan – Pittsburgh Steelers linebacker (Super Bowl champion: XXIX)
- Matt Lengel – New England Patriots tight end (Super Bowl champion: LI)
- Dan Ross – Cincinnati Bengals tight end
- Keith Willis – Pittsburgh Steelers linesman

== Conference affiliations ==
According to the 2019 book, The Playing Grounds of College Football, Northeastern's football program held the following conference affiliations:

- 1933–1937: Independent
- 1938–1944: New England Conference
- 1945–1992: Independent
- 1993–1996: Yankee Conference
- 1997–2003: Atlantic 10 Conference
- 2004–2009: CAA Football

Note – no teams were fielded in the 1943, 1944, or 1945 seasons due to World War II.
