= Educational Freedom Project =

- Abbreviation: EFP
- Founded: 2025; 1 year ago
- Founded at: Northeastern University
- Location: United States
- Website: educationalfreedomproject.org

The Educational Freedom Project (EFP) is a university student advocacy organization in Boston, Massachusetts. Founded at Northeastern University in 2025, EFP was established as a student-led association to address the lack of student representation and transparency in higher education.

== History ==
The Educational Freedom Project was founded at Northeastern University in 2025 by students Jack Masliah, Zi Glucksman, Eli Curwin, and Nicole Contreras. Following the Trump administration's policies on international students, DEI, and university research funding, Northeastern students formed the Educational Freedom Project to protect what they deemed the promise of higher education -- "a combination of learning, teaching, expression, and opportunity".

== Mission ==
EFP's mission statement is "to energize students and community members to transform their passion into collective action that will carry the promise of higher education forward". They advocate for increased transparency and accountability within higher education, and call for the free expression and representation of student voices.

== Impact ==
=== Student government resolution ===
In November 2025, EFP published a report assessing the Northeastern community's sentiment on university policies surrounding free speech, DEI, ICE, and administrative transparency. The report compiled and analyzed data collected from over 1,000 surveyed community members. Based on this report, EFP members -- including 2 Student Government Association (SGA) members -- authored the Student Government legislation A Senate Resolution to Create Light, Truth and Courage Reforms. The legislation urges Northeastern to adopt the Chicago Principles as well as calls to expand the Immigrant Justice Clinic, greater transparency in tuition costs and increases, and decreasing restrictions on student assembly and speech.

=== Students Rally for Light, Truth and Courage ===
In November 2025, EFP organized the "Students Rally for Light, Truth and Courage". University students and local organizations from more than 10 universities across Boston gathered to demand university leadership stand up to federal policies against students in institutions of higher education. The rally hosted a number of speakers, including Representative Ayanna Pressley.

=== City council hearing ===
In March 2026, Boston City Councilors Julia Mejia and Miniard Culpepper sponsored a hearing to review administrative transparency, student representation, and student freedoms in higher education across Boston. Through two panels and 28 public testimonies, students and professors from universities across Boston discussed the need for administrative transparency at the actions of their respective institutions. The second panel hosted members from EFP and SGA speaking on Northeastern's transparency, budget cuts, and other actions impacting the community.

In April 2026, Boston City Council passed the Resolution in Support of Administrative Transparency, Equitable Student and Community Representation, and Freedom of Speech in Higher Education calling for greater administrative transparency and formal student involvement in decision making across higher education.
