= Paws (Northeastern) =

Mascot of the Northeastern University Huskies

Paws or Paws, the Husky is the current mascot of the Northeastern University Huskies. Northeastern debuted the Siberian Husky as the school's official mascot and school's nickname on March 4, 1927.

== Paws ==
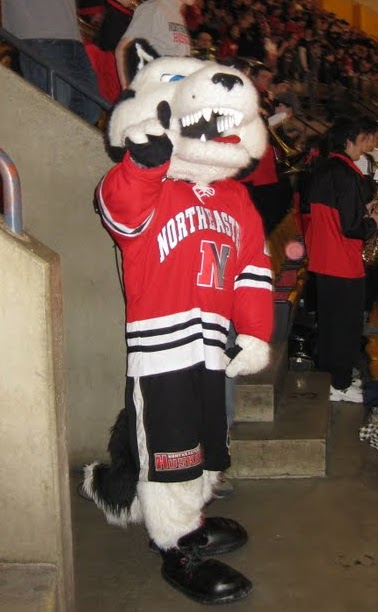
Paws, Northeastern Mascot

In the fall 2003, Northeastern announced the introduction of a new costumed mascot named Paws, who appears at various University sporting events as well as other University and community functions. Paws was designed to replace the student-elected Mr. and Mrs. Husky with a more athletic and charismatic mascot who would apply and try-out for the role. Introduced at a time when Northeastern did not have a live mascot, Paws is today joined by King Husky VIII.

== Live mascots ==
=== King Husky I (1927-1941) ===
King Husky, also known as Husky I or Husky the First, was born March 17, 1926, and came to Northeastern on March 4, 1927, after a committee was formed to choose a mascot for the University. Then-Vice-President Carl Ell chose a Siberian husky pup from legendary dog sled racer Leonhard Seppala and King Husky was introduced to the student body by Frank Speare during a day-long celebration which included a parade through the streets of Boston. King Husky I reigned for 14 years and his successors have appeared at countless athletic events, been the subject of television features, and won many honors at the most prestigious kennel club shows. King Husky died of natural causes on March 26, 1941.

=== Queen Husky I (1941) ===
Following the death of King Husky I, Queen Husky I was named school mascot on April 16, 1941. Queen Husky I succumbed to illness only a few months later, in July 1941.

=== King Husky II (1942-1952) ===
King Husky II was named successor to Queen Husky I in January 1942. King Husky II was the first mascot acquired from the Chinook Kennels of Wonalancet, New Hampshire. King Husky II served for 10 years before being retired by the University.

=== King Husky III (1952-1955) ===
King Husky III was named University mascot on September 24, 1952. He served as mascot until the summer of 1955 when he fell ill and was euthanized. Controversy surrounded the death of King Husky III as the University did not release information about the animal's death until after students had returned for the fall semester. Students viewed the lack of information as a cover-up and the editors of the student paper, the Northeastern News, planned to write an inflammatory story which was stopped by the Administration. Outraged over the perceived censorship, four student editors quit.

=== Princess Regent Husky (1955-1957) ===
In the wake of the death of King Husky III, Princess Regent Husky was named temporary mascot for the University in September 1955. She served as the mascot for two academic years before being succeeded by King Husky IV.

=== King Husky IV (1958) ===
King Husky IV was named mascot in February 1958. During the off-season in August, the kennel which housed King Husky IV suffered an extreme outbreak of distemper which claimed the lives of all the dogs at the facility.

=== Alyeskas Suggen (1958-1960) ===
Following the death of King Husky IV, his biological father, Alyeskas Suggen, was named temporary University mascot for the remainder of the football season and for the season after. During this time, the University commissioned the casting of a bronze statue and began the tradition of naming Mr. and Mrs. Husky.

=== King Husky V (1965-1970) ===
After a 5-year hiatus, the class of 1970 rekindled the tradition of the live mascot. A group of students purchased and trained a husky that would be known as King Husky V. Upon graduation of the Class of 1970, the dog returned to his original handler.

=== Queen Husky II (1970-1972) ===
Upon the departure of King Husky V, the University named Queen Husky II the school's mascot and put her in the care of Freshman student Liz Busa. Queen Husky II retired in 1972 after suffering from stage fright and being unable to perform her duties adequately.

=== King Husky VI (1972) ===
In September 1972, King Husky VI, the son of Queen Husky II, was named mascot. Unfortunately two months later, in November 1972, the dog escaped from his kennel and was struck by a vehicle. He finally succumbed to his injuries three days later.

=== King Husky VII (1973-1989) ===
King Husky VII was named mascot at the end of the 1972-73 school year and served until his death in 1989. The University finally ended the tradition of naming a live mascot for a number of years.

=== King Husky VIII (2005-Present) ===
The live mascot tradition was reintroduced in 2005 by the Dean of Student Affairs, Clyde Speare.

== Mr. and Mrs. Husky ==
In 1959, after a number of years of turmoil with live mascots, the University began holding an annual competition to name Mr. Husky, a male student assigned to wear a husky costume to sporting events. In later years, a female student has also been named Mrs. Husky. Although the naming of a Mr. and Mrs. Husky is a tradition that still continues today, the role of mascot has been assigned to Paws. The elected students' roles are titular only.

== Other Husky Mascots and Icons ==
In 1958, after the repeated death of the University's live mascots, the administration commissioned the casting of a statue to replace the live mascot. The statue was completed and unveiled at the University's Ell Hall in September 1962 and can still be found there today. While initially not well received, over the years a tradition has emerged where students would rub the nose of the statue for good luck. An identical statue of King Husky was later cast and placed at the entrance to the field house at Parsons Field.
