= Ruth Aguilera =

American management science scholar

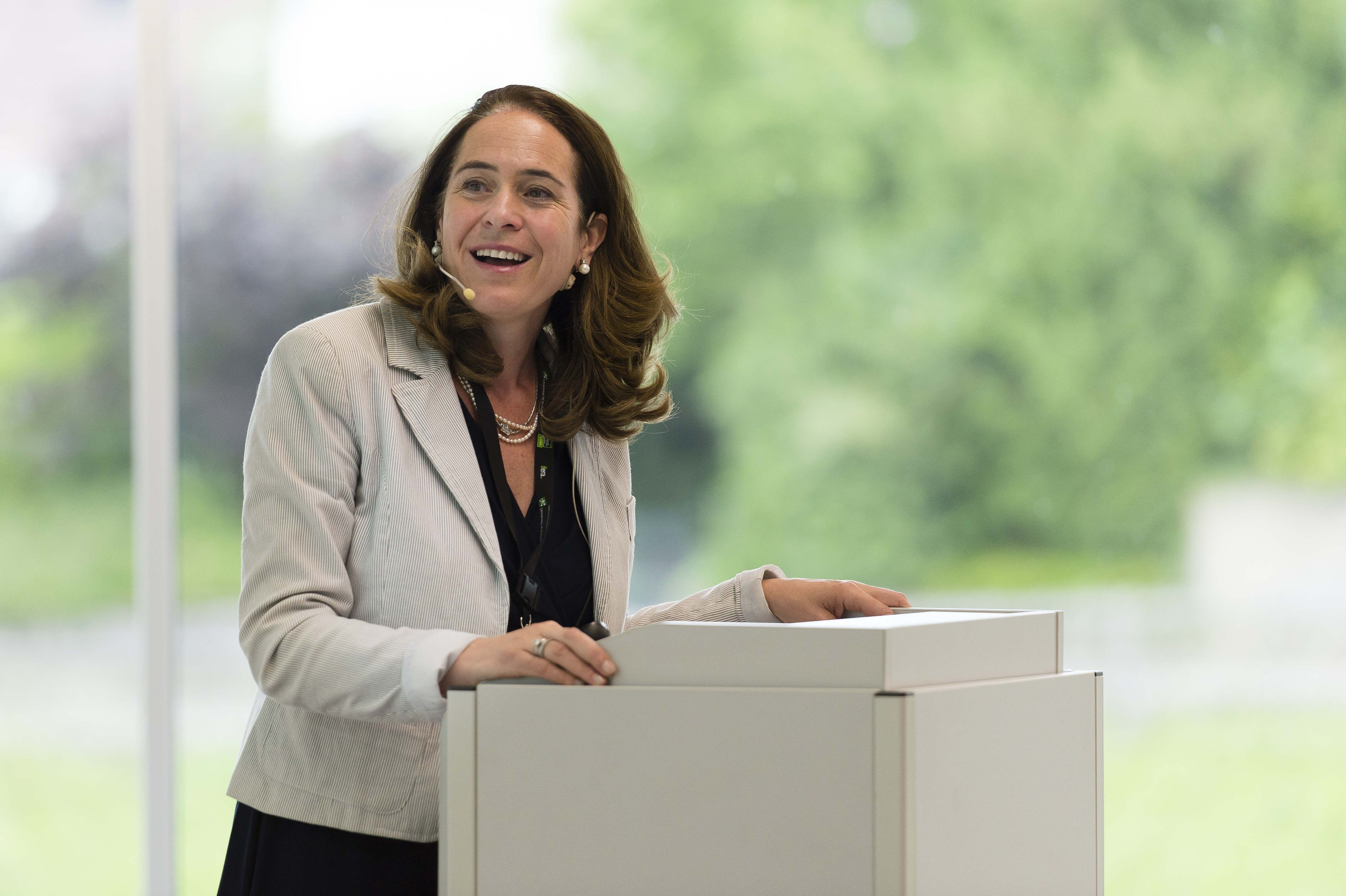
Aguilera in 2013

Ruth V. Aguilera is a Boston-based management science scholar, known by the wider public for her research on the monitoring and transformation of global corporate governance to enhance global business performance. She is the Distinguished Darla and Frederick Brodsky Trustee Professor in Global Business at the D'Amore-McKim School of Business at Northeastern University, as well as a visiting professor at ESADE Business School in her hometown, Barcelona, Catalonia, Spain.

== Education ==
She holds degrees in economics (BBA) and business administration (MA, 1992) from the University of Barcelona. She obtained her master's (AM, 1996) and PhD (1999) degrees in sociology from Harvard University. Her doctoral thesis is titled "Elites, Corporations, and the Wealth of Nations".

== Career ==
After completion of her doctorate, she began academic work as a faculty fellow at the College of Business, University of Illinois Urbana-Champaign, where she remained as a tenured professor until 2014. In 2014-15, she was a professor at the Business School, National University of Singapore. Since 2015, she has been a distinguished professor at the D'Amore-McKim School of Business at Northeastern University. Concurrently, since 2020, she has been a visiting professor at the Department of Strategy and General Management, Esade Business School, Universitat Ramon Llull, in Barcelona, Catalonia, Spain.

=== Editorial service ===
She has been an active editor in many academic journals, including Academy of Management Review, Academy of Management Perspectives, Administrative Science Quarterly, Business Ethics: A European Review, Corporate governance: An International Review, Global Strategy Journal, Journal of International Business Studies, Journal of Management and Governance, Management International Review, Organization Science, Organization Studies, Organization Theory, Oxford Handbooks/Oxford Research Reviews, Strategic Management Journal, and Strategy Insights.

=== Memberships ===
She has successively been inducted as a Fellow of the Academy of International Business (2016), a Fellow of the Strategic Management Society (2018), and a Fellow of the Academy of Management (2022).

== Publications ==
=== Papers ===
Her most cited papers are:

- Aguilera, Ruth V.; Jackson, Gregory (2003). "The Cross-National Diversity of Corporate Governance: Dimensions and Determinants". Academy of Management Review. 28 (3): 447–465. doi:10.5465/amr.2003.10196772 . Cited 2970 times (March 2024).
- Aguilera, Ruth V.; Cuervo-Cazurra, Alvaro (2004). "Codes of Good Governance Worldwide: What is the Trigger?". Organization Studies. 25 (3): 415–443. doi:10.1177/0170840604040669. Cited 1160 times (March 2024).
- Rupp, Deborah E.; Ganapathi, Jyoti; Aguilera, Ruth V.; Williams, Cynthia A. (2006). "Employee reactions to corporate social responsibility: an organizational justice framework". Journal of Organizational Behavior. 27 (4): 537–543. doi:10.1002/job.380. Cited 1387 times (March 2024).
- Aguilera, Ruth V.; Rupp, Deborah E.; Williams, Cynthia A.; Ganapathi, Jyoti (2007). "Putting the S back in corporate social responsibility: A multilevel theory of social change in organizations". Academy of Management Review. 32 (3): 836–863. doi:10.5465/amr.2007.25275678. Cited 4841 times (March 2024).

=== Books ===
- Federowicz, Michał; Aguilera, Ruth V., eds. (2003). Corporate Governance in a Changing Economic and Political Environment. London: Palgrave Macmillan UK. doi:10.1057/9780230286191. ISBN 978-1-349-51500-4.

=== Book chapters ===
She has authored many book chapters whose title list may be reached on Researchgate.
