= Northeastern University =

Private university primarily in Boston, Massachusetts, US

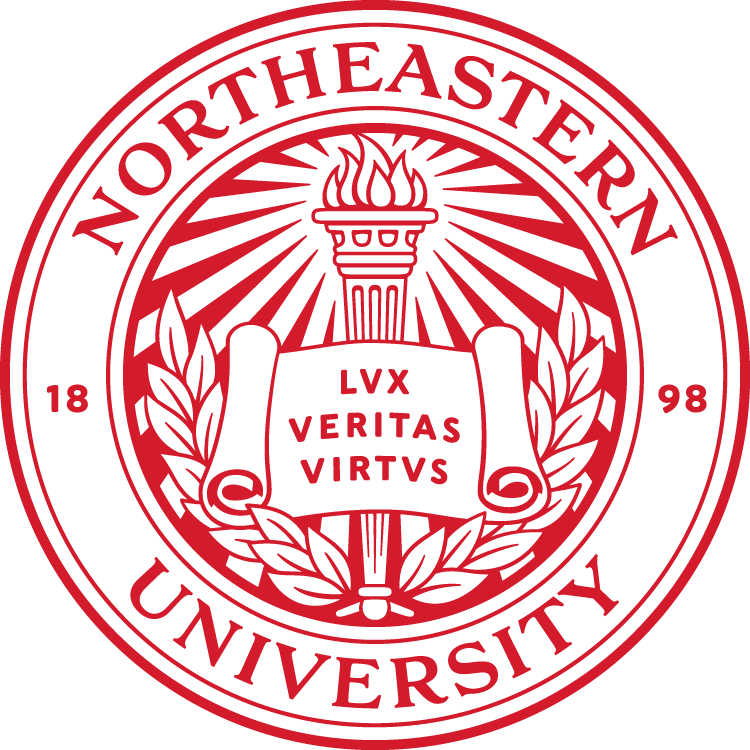
- Former names: Evening Institute for Younger Men (1898–1916); Northeastern College (1916–1922)
- Motto: Lux, Veritas, Virtus (Latin)
- Motto in English: "Light, Truth, Courage"
- Type: Private research university
- Established: 1898; 128 years ago
- Accreditation: NECHE
- Academic affiliations: NAICU; URA; Space-grant; CUIBE
- Endowment: $2.1 billion (2025)
- Budget: $2.2 billion (FY 2024)
- President: Joseph E. Aoun
- Provost: Beth Winkelstein
- Academic staff: 1,736 full-time, 946 part-time
- Students: 38,403 (fall 2025)
- Undergraduates: 22,456 (fall 2025)
- Postgraduates: 15,947 (fall 2025)
- Location: Boston, Massachusetts, United States; 42°20′24″N 71°05′18″W
- Campus: Large city, 73 acres (30 hectares)
- Other campuses: Arlington; Burlington; Charlotte; Nahant; Miami, Florida; New York; Oakland; Portland, Maine; Silicon Valley; Seattle; London; Toronto; Vancouver
- Newspaper: The Huntington News
- Colors: Red and black
- Nickname: Huskies
- Sporting affiliations: NCAA Division I – CAA; Hockey East; EARC; EAWRC; NEISA; IRA
- Mascot: Paws the Husky
- Website: northeastern.edu

Northeastern University (abbreviated as NU or NEU) is a private research university with its main campus in Boston, Massachusetts, United States. It was founded by the Boston Young Men's Christian Association in 1898 as an all-male institute before being incorporated as Northeastern College in 1916, gaining university status in 1922.

With more than 38,000 students, Northeastern is the largest university in Massachusetts by enrollment. The university's main campus in Boston is located within the center of the city along Huntington Avenue and Columbus Avenue near the Fenway–Kenmore and Roxbury neighborhoods. It offers undergraduate and graduate programs, and 93% of undergraduates participate in a cooperative education program. Northeastern is accredited by the New England Commission of Higher Education and is a member of the Boston Consortium for Higher Education. It is classified among "R1: Doctoral Universities – Very high research activity".

Northeastern maintains satellite campuses in Charlotte, North Carolina; Seattle, Washington; San Jose, California; Oakland, California; Portland, Maine; Burlington, Massachusetts; Miami, Florida; New York City; London; and Toronto and Vancouver in Canada. The university's sports teams, the Northeastern Huskies, compete in NCAA Division I as members of the Coastal Athletic Association (CAA) in 18 varsity sports. The men's and women's hockey teams compete in Hockey East, while the men's and women's rowing teams compete in the Eastern Association of Rowing Colleges (EARC) and Eastern Association of Women's Rowing Colleges (EAWRC), respectively.

== History ==
=== Early days ===
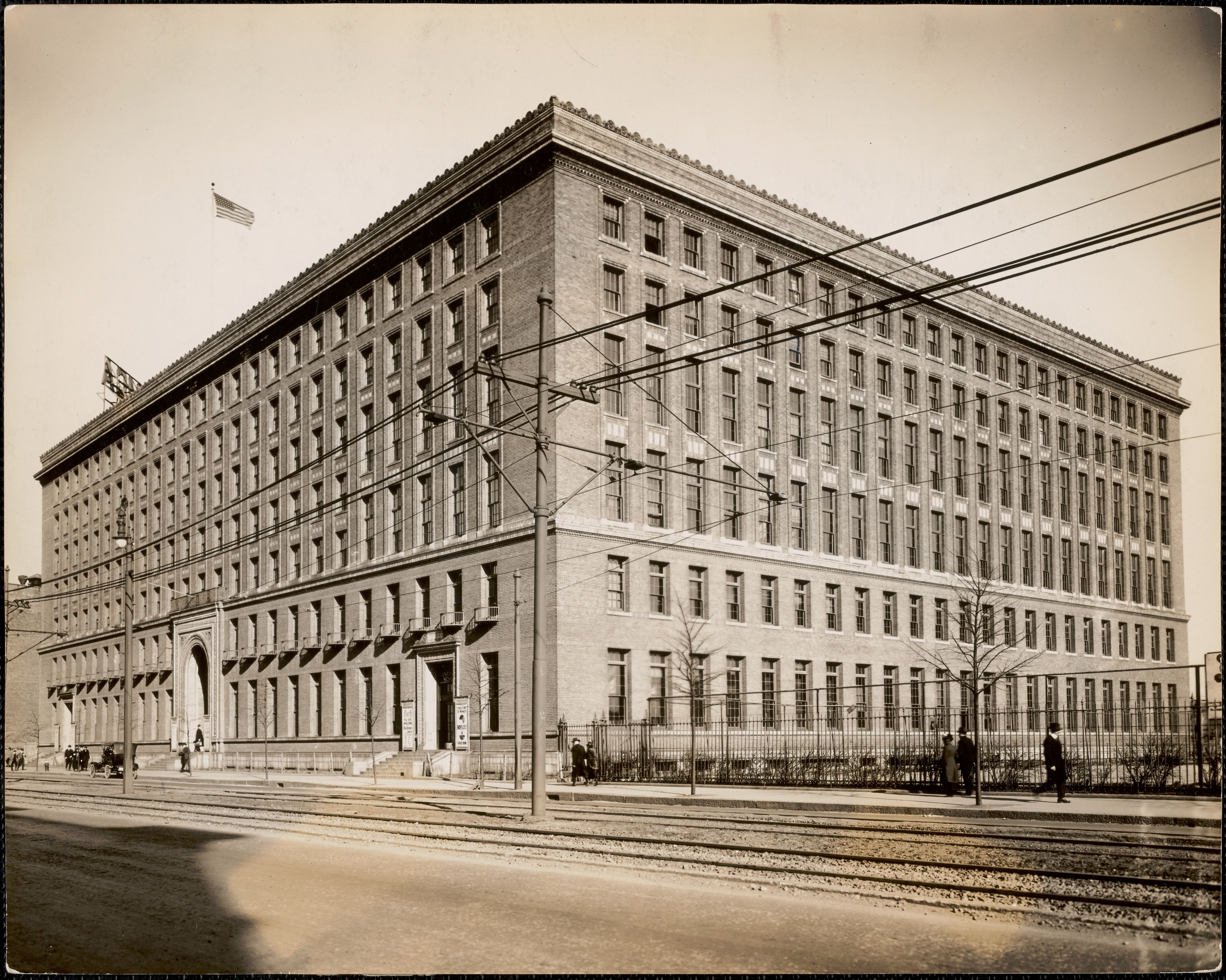
The Huntington Avenue YMCA c. 1920, site of the Evening Institute for Young Men.

In May 1896, directors of the Boston Young Men's Christian Association, the first in the U.S., established an Evening Institute for Younger Men to merge, coordinate and improve its classes that had evolved over the past 40 years. A good education for "any young man of moral character" with a YMCA membership was promised. In 1898, the institute held its first classes. In 1903, the first Automobile Engineering School in the country was established, followed by a Polytechnic School and a School of Commerce and Finance.

In 1909, the Polytechnic School began offering cooperative engineering courses to eight students. In 1920, the Cooperative School of Engineering, which later became the College of Engineering, was first authorized to grant degrees in civil, chemical, electrical and mechanical engineering. The cooperative program, the second of its kind in the U.S. after one in Cincinnati, Ohio, was eventually adopted by all departments.

On March 30, 1917, veteran educator Frank Palmer Speare, who had served as director of the institute, was inaugurated as the first president of the newly incorporated Northeastern College. Five years later, the college changed its name to Northeastern University to better reflect its growing academic depth, securing general (A.B. and B.S.) degree-granting power from the Legislature in 1923.

The College of Liberal Arts was added in 1935. Two years later, the Northeastern University Corporation was established, with a board of trustees composed of 31 university members and 8 from the YMCA. Following World War II, Northeastern began admitting women, and completely separated from the YMCA in 1948.

=== 1959–1975 ===
By 1959, when Carl Ell stepped down as president, Northeastern had a local identity as an independent technical university serving a commuter and adult population. That reputation shifted during the presidency of Asa S. Knowles, from 1959 to 1975. Facing a postwar educational boom, the university broadened undergraduate programs, strengthened graduate offerings, modernized administrative and faculty structures, created a Faculty Senate, launched its first-ever capital campaign, reorganized and expanded adult and continuing education, and increased the number of colleges. The university created the College of Education (1953), University College (1960), now called the College of Professional Studies, and the colleges of Pharmacy and Nursing (1964), which both later merged into the Bouvé College of Health Sciences. The creation of the College of Criminal Justice (1967) followed, and then the Khoury College of Computer Sciences (1982), the first dedicated computer science college in the United States.

Between 1959 and 1975, Northeastern's student population grew considerably larger and more diverse. At the beginning of this period, most of the student body was composed of white males from New England, the majority of whom came from the Boston-area public schools and primarily studied business or engineering. By 1974–75, women accounted for 33 percent of nearly 14,000 undergraduates, while 5 percent were black. Over 900 students came from different foreign countries. Of the graduating class of 2,238, 513 were in Liberal Arts, 462 in Engineering, 389 in Business, 227 in Pharmacy and Allied Health, and the remainder were roughly divided among Education, Boston-Bouvé, Nursing and Criminal Justice.

To attract more women, the university refurbished existing facilities, constructed new women's dormitories, and encouraged their participation in all programs. The merger with Boston-Bouvé, a women's college dedicated to physical health, and the creation of the College of Nursing, traditionally a female profession, also contributed to the increase. In the early 1960s, with financial assistance from the Ford Foundation in New York in the form of scholarships and co-ops to black high school students, Northeastern began actively recruiting black students. By 1975, black student-led organizations included the Afro-photo Society, Student Grill, Health Careers Club, The Onyx (a black student newspaper), Muhindi Literary Guild, the Outing Club, Black Engineering Society, and the first recognized black fraternity at the university, the Omicron chapter of Iota Phi Theta. In addition, the number of foreign students increased from 170 in the 1950s and 1960s to 960 by 1974–75.

=== 1975–1996 ===
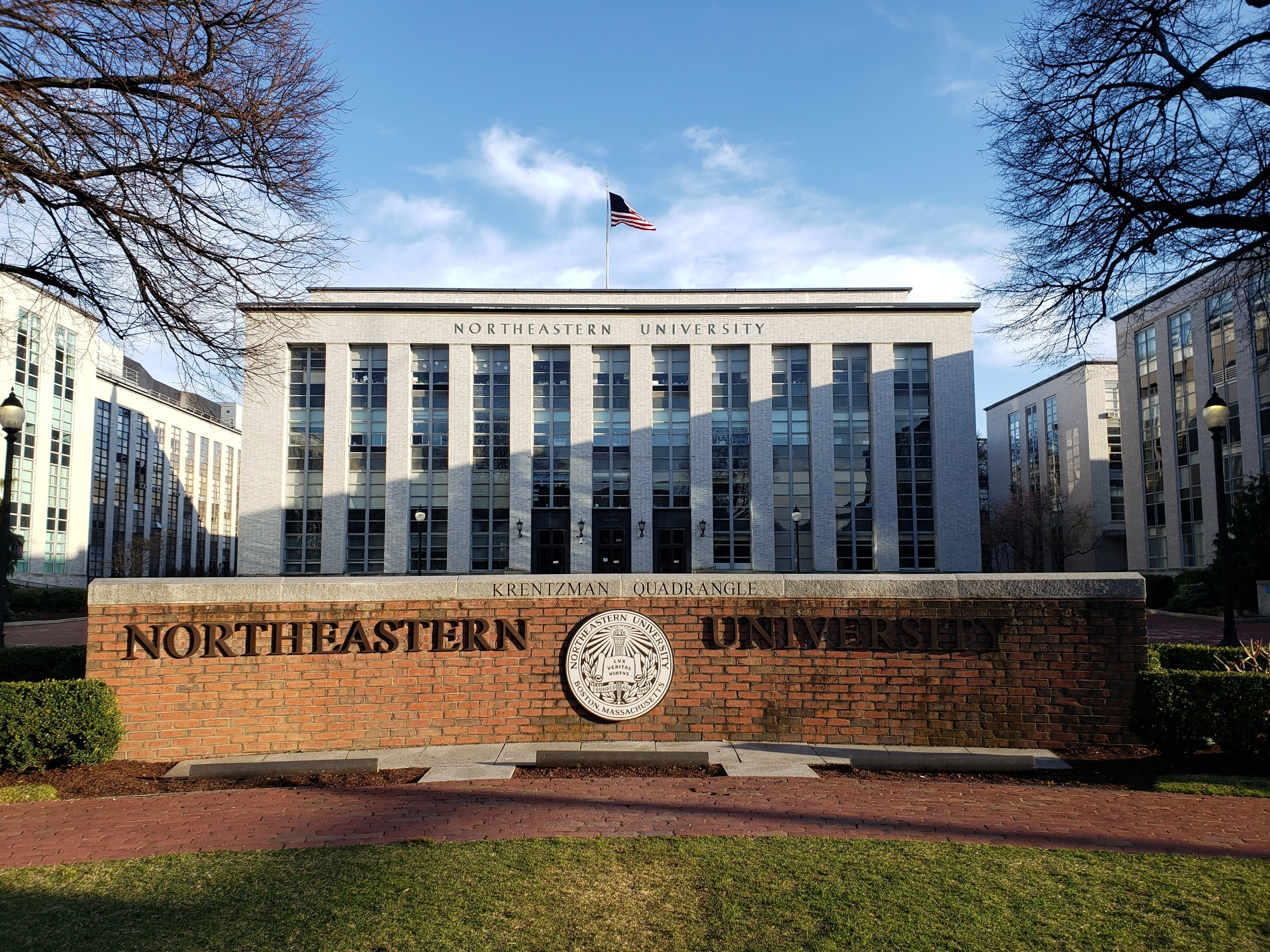
Northeastern's historic Ell Hall on Huntington Avenue.

By the early 1980s, under President Kenneth G. Ryder, Northeastern had grown into one of the largest private universities in the nation with around 55,000 students. In 1990, the first class with more live-on campus rather than commuter students graduated. After Ryder's retirement in 1989, the university adopted a slow and more thoughtful approach to change. In 1991, President John A. Curry formulated a new strategy to transform Northeastern into a "smaller, leaner, better place to work and study," with a renewed focus on student success and academic quality. The university streamlined operations and reduced admissions targets, with applicant numbers rising and attrition rates falling by the end of Curry's tenure.

=== 1996–2006 ===
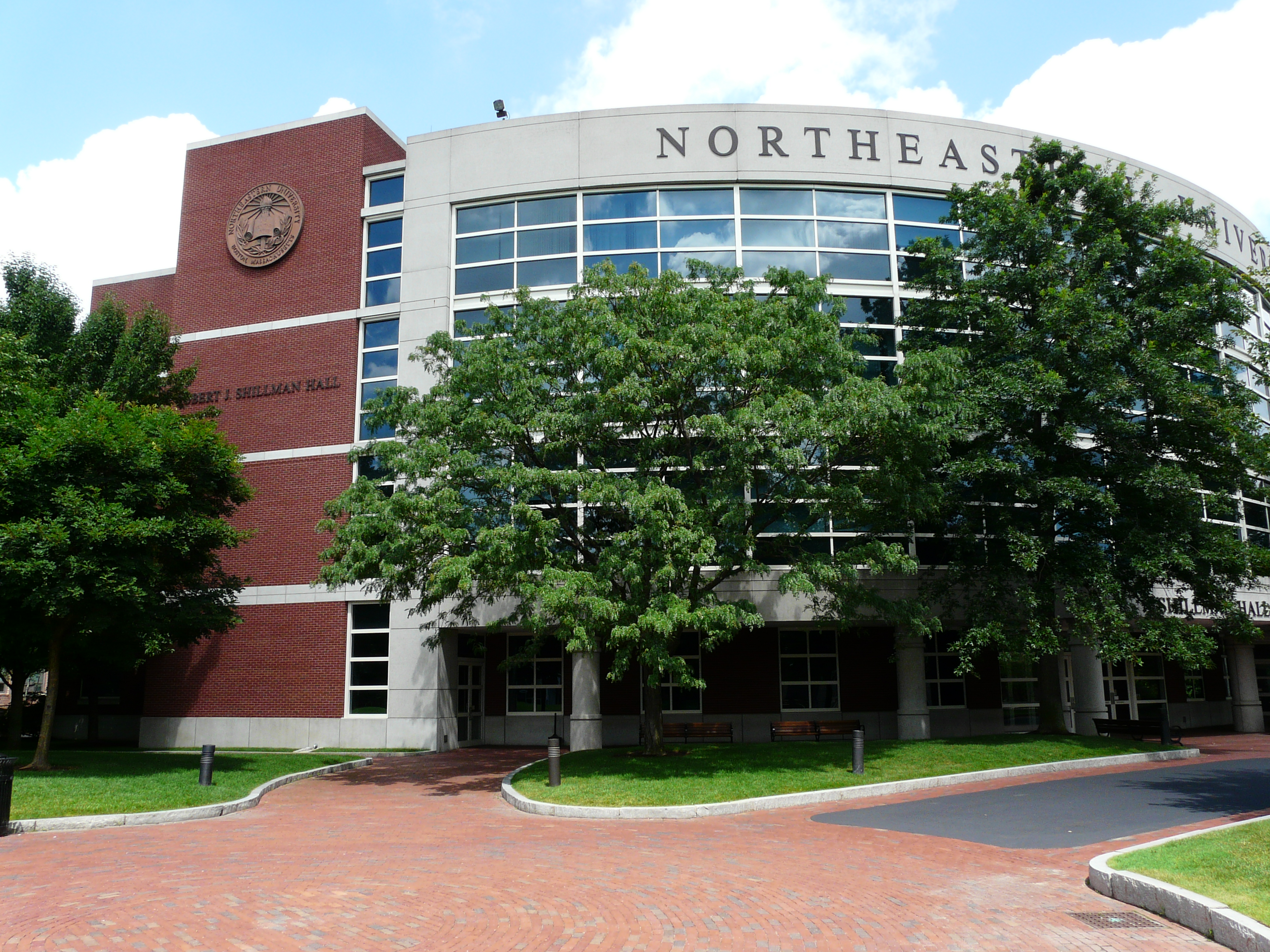
Robert J. Shillman Hall, constructed in 1995.

When Curry left office in 1996, the university population had been systematically reduced to about 25,000. Incoming president Richard M. Freeland decided to focus on recruiting the type of students who were already graduating as the school's prime demographic. Freeland focused on improving academics and restructuring the administration with a goal of "creating the country's premier program of practice-oriented education". In the early 1990s, the university began a $485 million construction program that included residence halls, academic and research facilities, and athletic centers. During the university's transition, Freeland reorganized the cooperative education system, decentralizing it into a department-based system to allow better integration of classroom learning with workplace experience. Full-time degree programs shifted from a four-quarter system to two traditional semesters and two summer "minimesters," giving students deeper academic focus and longer, more substantive co-op placements, and forcing departments to redesign aging programs. Freeland also created a marketing department, uncommon for universities at the time, and expanded the university advancement office, while setting an ambitious $200 million fundraising target with the goal of reducing dependency on tuition.

Between 1995 and 2007, average SAT exam scores increased by more than 200 points, retention rates rose dramatically, and applications doubled. In 1998, Freeland set an admissions target of 2,800 freshmen per year, allowing for adequate tuition income without compromising on education. Throughout the transformation, his oft-repeated goal was to crack the top 100 of the U.S. News & World Report's rankings of America's best universities. With this accomplished by 2005, the transformation goal from commuter school to nationally recognized research university was complete. Freeland stepped down on August 15, 2006, and was followed by President Joseph E. Aoun, a former dean at the University of Southern California.

=== 2006–present ===
As part of a five-year, $75 million Academic Investment Plan that ran from 2004 to 2009, the university concentrated on undergraduate education, core graduate professional programs, and centers of research excellence. Faculty was originally to be bolstered by 100 new tenured and tenure-track professors, later expanded to include 300 additional tenure and tenure-track faculty in interdisciplinary fields. Aoun also placed more emphasis on improving community relations by reaching out to leaders of the neighborhoods surrounding the university. In addition, the university created more academic partnerships with other institutions in the Boston area, including Tufts University, Hebrew College, and the School of the Museum of Fine Arts.

During this period, Northeastern rapidly advanced in national rankings. It placed 39th in the 2016–17 edition of U.S. News & World Report's best colleges and universities rankings, an 8-position jump from 2015–16 and a 30-place gain since 2010–11. This rise created a positive feedback effect, allowing the institution to significantly increase its endowment, achieve R1 research classification, attract stronger students and faculty, and enhance its flagship co-op program.

In 2013, Northeastern launched the Empower Campaign to support students, advance faculty, and drive innovation in education and research, inspired by Richard D'Amore and Alan McKim's $60 million gift to the business school in 2012. Its goal was to raise $1 billion by 2017, split evenly between philanthropic support and government partnerships. The target was raised to $1.25 billion in 2015, and the campaign had surpassed both goals by October 2017 with a final total of $1.4 billion. More than 100,000 individuals and over 3,800 organizations donated to Empower from 110 countries.

The university launched the "Experience Powered by Northeastern" global fundraising initiative in October 2022. Driven by consecutive record-breaking fundraising years, the university raised the target in February 2025 from an original $1.3 billion to $1.75 billion. The capital campaign finances investments in student opportunities, faculty and infrastructure, research breakthroughs, and entrepreneurship. A priority of the campaign is expanding financial accessibility by upholding "The Northeastern Promise", a compact that guarantees the university meets 100% of demonstrated need for undergraduates, a practice upheld for every student enrolled since 2015–16. As of the 2024–25 school year, the average annual net price of enrollment is $28,521 and the average undergraduate debt has dropped by 34% over the past decade. Over 70% of first-year students receive financial aid, including merit scholarships and need-based grants. Northeastern has also hired 250 tenured and tenure-track faculty focused on interdisciplinary collaboration and doubled external research funding in the past five years.

=== Presidents ===
Presidents of Northeastern University:

- Frank Palmer Speare (1898–1940)
- Carl Stephens Ell (1940–1959)
- Asa S. Knowles (1959–1975)
- Kenneth G. Ryder (1975–1989)
- John A. Curry (1989–1996)
- Richard M. Freeland (1996–2006)
- Joseph E. Aoun (2006–present)

== Academics ==
Northeastern offers 371 undergraduate majors; 304 of these are combined majors, such as Business Administration/Data Science. At the graduate level, there are 39 PhD programs and 264 other graduate programs. Northeastern had 3,488 faculty in Fall 2024. Academics at Northeastern are grounded in a liberal arts education and the integration of classroom studies with experiential learning opportunities, including cooperative education, student research, service learning, and global experience, including study abroad and international co-op. The university's cooperative education program places over 10,000 students annually in full-time, paid professional positions with over 4,000 co-op employers in Boston and around the world.

Northeastern University is accredited by the New England Commission of Higher Education.

=== Colleges and schools ===
Northeastern University has eight degree-granting colleges:

- College of Arts, Media and Design
- Khoury College of Computer Sciences
- College of Engineering
- Bouvé College of Health Sciences
- College of Professional Studies
- College of Science
- College of Social Sciences and Humanities
- Mills College at Northeastern University

These colleges house schools and departments. There are also two separate schools, not housed within the other colleges:

- D'Amore-McKim School of Business
- Northeastern University School of Law

=== John Martinson Honors Program ===
In 2024, venture capitalist John Martinson donated $5 million as part of Northeastern's reimagined honors program. Northeastern's John Martinson Honors Program selects students from the regular applicant pool with no separate application. The program includes specialty work in a major field through college-specific choices, including specialized advanced honors seminars and an independent research project. Honors students receive exclusive housing in their first year, placed in a Living-Learning Community in either East Village or International Village. In 2017, the program introduced the Student Assessed Integrated Learning (SAIL) app, which was later retired, as well as a one-credit Honors Discovery course for students to explore Northeastern. In this course, they are introduced to the program's key outcomes: "Stoking Intellectual Curiosity, Creating a Thriving Honors Community, Facilitating Self-Exploration and Discovery, and, ultimately, Making an Impact in the World."

=== Cooperative education (co-op) ===
Launched in 1909, Northeastern has one of the largest and oldest cooperative education (co-op) programs in the world. In order to graduate from Northeastern, all students must meet the cooperative education requirement, which can be achieved through a co-op employment, research experiences, or studying abroad. 96% of students participate in at least one co-op during their college career, however students are able to complete one, two, or three employment placements before graduation. When pursuing two or three placements, students alternate periods of academic study with periods of (typically paid) professional employment related to their major. If students complete three co-op employment placements, they typically take five years to graduate. If they complete one or two, they may graduate in four years or less.

Students on co-op do not pay tuition, and students not living on campus do not pay room and board. The co-op program typically begins in the spring of the second year or fall of the third year (after a more traditional program for the first semesters on campus). Students usually take anywhere between one and three with 96% participating in one and 78% participating in two or more.

58% of Northeastern students receive a job offer from a previous co-op employer as of 2026.

=== Study abroad ===
Northeastern has semester-long study abroad programs with placements in Africa, Asia, Australia, Europe, and South America. Some participating schools include: University of Cambridge and London School of Economics, England; University of Edinburgh, Scotland; Reims Management School, France; European School of Business and Council on International Educational Exchange, Germany; University of Cape Town, South Africa; University of Auckland, New Zealand; Swinburne University of Technology, Australia; University of Tokyo, Japan; American College of Thessaloniki, Greece and Pontificia Universidad Católica de Chile, Chile and also Antarctica.

Northeastern's International Business program is a member of the International Partnership of Business Schools. Through this program International Business students have the opportunity to be awarded a dual-degree from Northeastern as well as from a sister school abroad.

=== Research ===
The university provides undergraduate students with an opportunity to engage in research through the CenSSIS Research Experience for Undergraduates, Honors Research, Louis Stokes Alliance for Minority Participation program, and Provost's Office research grants. Federally funded operating grants and contracts reached $268 million in FY 2024, with total research grants and funding exceeding $281 million. Northeastern is among a select group of universities in the United States exceeding $200 million in annual research awards without a medical campus. Northeastern also houses the Network Science Institute (NetSI), which hosts the only Ph.D. program in Network Science in the United States. In 2011, Northeastern opened the George J. Kostas Research Institute for Homeland security, named after its chief benefactor. Northeastern most recently opened EXP in 2023, an eight-story 357,000-square-foot facility for science, engineering, and computational research, and Interdisciplinary Science and Engineering Complex (ISEC) in 2017 for health sciences and computer science research.

=== Undergraduate admissions ===
Fall enrollment statistics, freshmen
	2026	2025	2024	2023	2022
Applicants	106,907	105,257	98,425	96,327	91,086
Admits		5,916	5,133	5,459	6,179
Admit rate	5.2%	5.6%	5.2%	5.6%	6.7%
Enrolled		2,736	2,759	2,738	2,620
Yield		46.2%	53.8%	50.2%	42.4%
SAT range	1440-1540	1440–1510	1450–1520	1460–1530	1450–1535
ACT range	33-35	33–35	33–35	33–35	33–35

For undergraduate students, Northeastern's 2025 acceptance rate was 5.6%. Of the record-large pool of 105,257 applicants, only 5,916 were admitted. The sharp rise in applications and drop in admission has exponentially increased in recent years. Additionally, Northeastern was the second most applied-to private university in the nation in 2025.

For the Class of 2029 (enrolling fall 2025), Northeastern received 105,257 applications, accepted 5,916 (5.6%), and enrolled 2,736. For the freshmen who enrolled, the middle 50% range of composite SAT scores was 1440–1510, while the middle 50% range ACT composite range was 33-35.

The number of international students totals over 12,000 representing 138 different nations and over half of the student body. The number of international students at Northeastern has steadily increased by about 1,000 students every year since 2008.

Northeastern University's "Northeastern Promise" guarantees the university meets full demonstrated financial need of all admitted students eligible for federal financial aid.

== Rankings ==
Academic rankings

National
- Forbes: 69
- U.S. News & World Report: 42
- Washington Monthly: 66
- WSJ/College Pulse: 138

Global
- QS: 384
- THE: 201–250
- U.S. News & World Report: 220

As of the 2027 edition of U.S. News & World Report rankings, Northeastern was 42nd in the National Universities category.

=== Specialty rankings ===
- 1st in "Best Co-ops/Internships" (U.S. News & World Report) (2020, 2021, 2022, 2023, 2024, 2025, 2026, 2027)
- 1st in "Best Schools for Internships" (Princeton Review) (2024, 2025, 2026, 2027)
- 2nd in "Best Graduate Psychology Programs" (2018)
- 2nd in "Best Physician Assistant Programs" (2018)
- 3rd in "Best Nursing-Anesthesia Programs" (2018)
- 3rd in "Best Career Services" (Princeton Review) (2016, 2017, 2018)
- 4th in "Top 25 Entrepreneurship: Ugrad" (Princeton Review) (2017, 2018)
- 4th in "Best Health Care Law Programs" (2018)
- 5th in "Most Innovative Schools" (U.S. News & World Report) (2026) (up from 6th in 2018)
- 7th in "The Top 25 B.A. Theatre Programs for 2018–19" (OnStage Blog)
- 9th in "Best Undergraduate International Business Programs" (U.S. News & World Report) (2018)

== Campus ==
Northeastern University's main campus is located on 73 acres (30 ha) mostly along Huntington Avenue and Columbus Avenue in an area known as the Fenway Cultural District, part of Boston's Fenway and Roxbury neighborhood, near the Museum of Fine Arts, Symphony Hall, New England Conservatory, and Christian Science Center.

In 2019, the campus was officially designated as an arboretum by ArbNet, making it the only campus in Boston to receive the designation.

The first baseball World Series took place on the Huntington Avenue Grounds, now part of the campus. The site is commemorated in front of Churchill Hall by a statue of Cy Young.

In 2014, Northeastern officially launched a Public Art Initiative to place a series of murals and other art around the Boston campus. Among those whose work has been commissioned are French artist Jef Aérosol, Houston-born artist Daniel Anguilu, Los Angeles-based El Mac and Charleston, South Carolina-born artist Shepard Fairey, known for his 2008 Barack Obama "Hope" poster.

=== Campus development ===
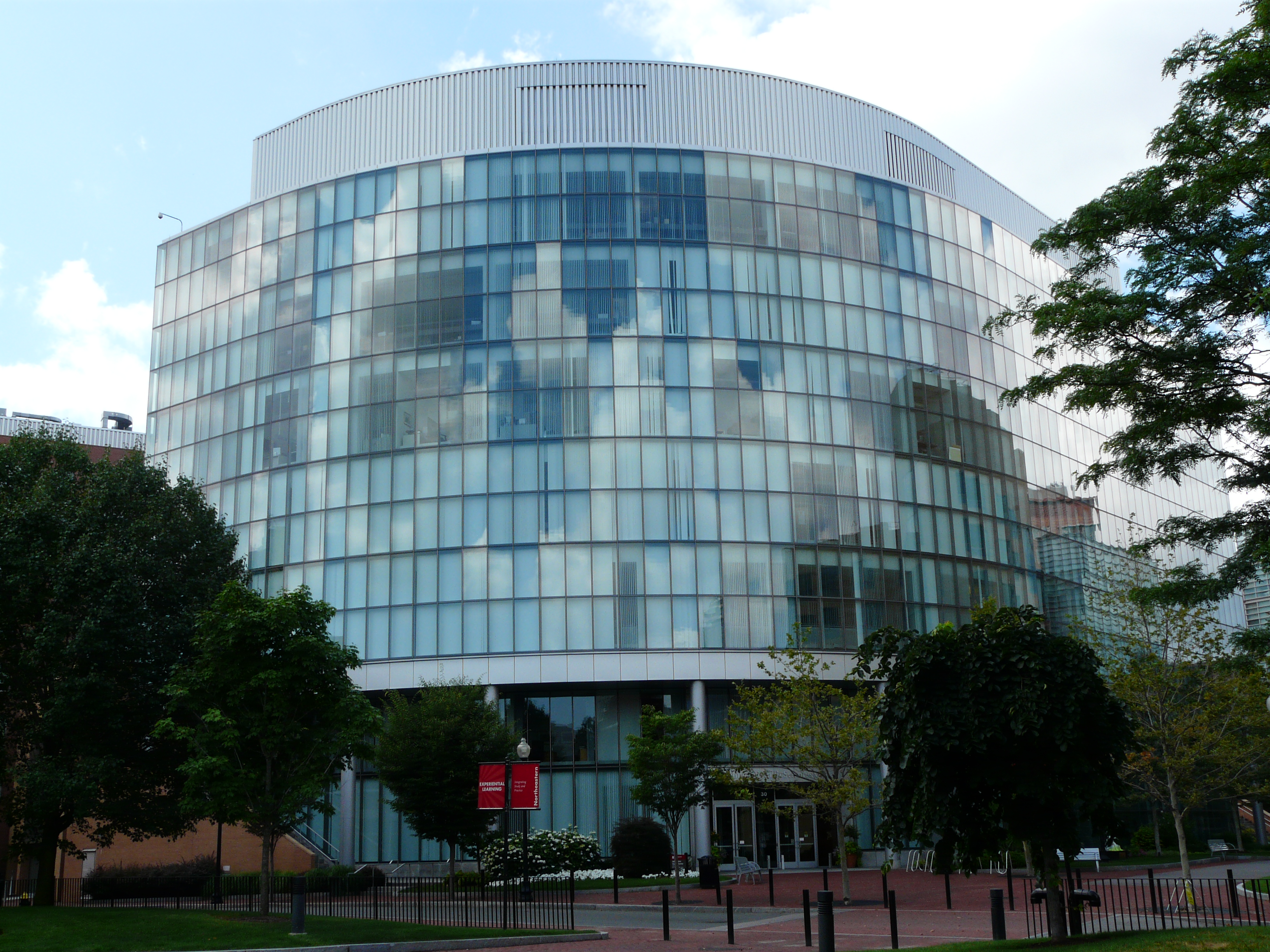
Completed in 2002, the Behrakis Health Sciences Center houses the Bouvé College of Health Sciences.

In the 1930s, during the Great Depression, as enrollment grew to over 4,600 students, President Frank Palmer Speare announced that Northeastern would build a new campus. Coolidge Shepley Bulfinch and Abbott, a Boston-based architectural firm, was selected to design the campus near the Huntington Avenue YMCA building, which continued to house library and classroom spaces.

In October 1938, Richards Hall, which housed classrooms, laboratories, and administrative offices, was the first building to be completed. Its light gray, glazed brick exterior, with vertical strips of windows, was replicated in other buildings of what later became known as the 1944 master plan, characterized by a mix of Beaux-Arts and Bauhaus architectural styles defined by stripped-down classicism and open courtyards that resembled those of the Massachusetts Institute of Technology across the Charles River. In a 1934 article, the Boston Evening Transcript described the campus design as "modernistic classical".

In 1961, under President Asa Knowles, the university purchased a 7-acre (2.8-hectare) red brick industrial complex once owned by the United Drug Company to build athletic facilities. Three of the buildings facing Forsyth Street were demolished, but due to a need for more office and lab space, the remaining buildings were divided into four sections now called Lake Hall, Holmes Hall, Nightingale Hall, and Meserve Hall.

Major recent developments have included Northeastern becoming recognized as an arboretum, opening a US$225 million research and laboratory complex known as the Interdisciplinary Science and Engineering Complex (ISEC) in 2017, launching the Institute for Experiential Artificial Intelligence with a US$50 million donation, and renaming the College of Computer and Information Science to the Khoury College of Computer Sciences with another US$50 million donation from Amin Khoury.

In 2023, EXP opened, another large research facility created to support Northeastern's work in autonomous vehicles, drones, and humanoid robots. This building is approximately 350,000 square feet (33,000 m^{2}), including a 15,000-square-foot (1,400 m^{2}) makers space for students of all colleges and degree levels.

In November 2025, Northeastern's 2025-2035 institutional master plan was approved. The plan included the replacement of Matthews Arena and the Cabot Center, residential buildings White Hall, Burstein Hall, Rubenstein Hall, and academic buildings Cullinane Hall, Hurtig Hall, Forsyth Hall, and the complex composed of Lake, Meserve, Nightingale, and Holmes halls. The plan also includes the replacement of the Gainsborough Garage with a 320,000-square-foot academic building.

White Hall will be replaced with a 322,500-square-foot residence hall with 1,050 beds. Burstein Hall and Rubenstein Hall will be demolished and replaced with a new 262,600-square-foot residence hall containing 910 beds. Combined with the new 840 Columbus Avenue residence hall opening in 2028, Northeastern will provide 3,330 new bedspaces by 2035.

=== Sustainability ===
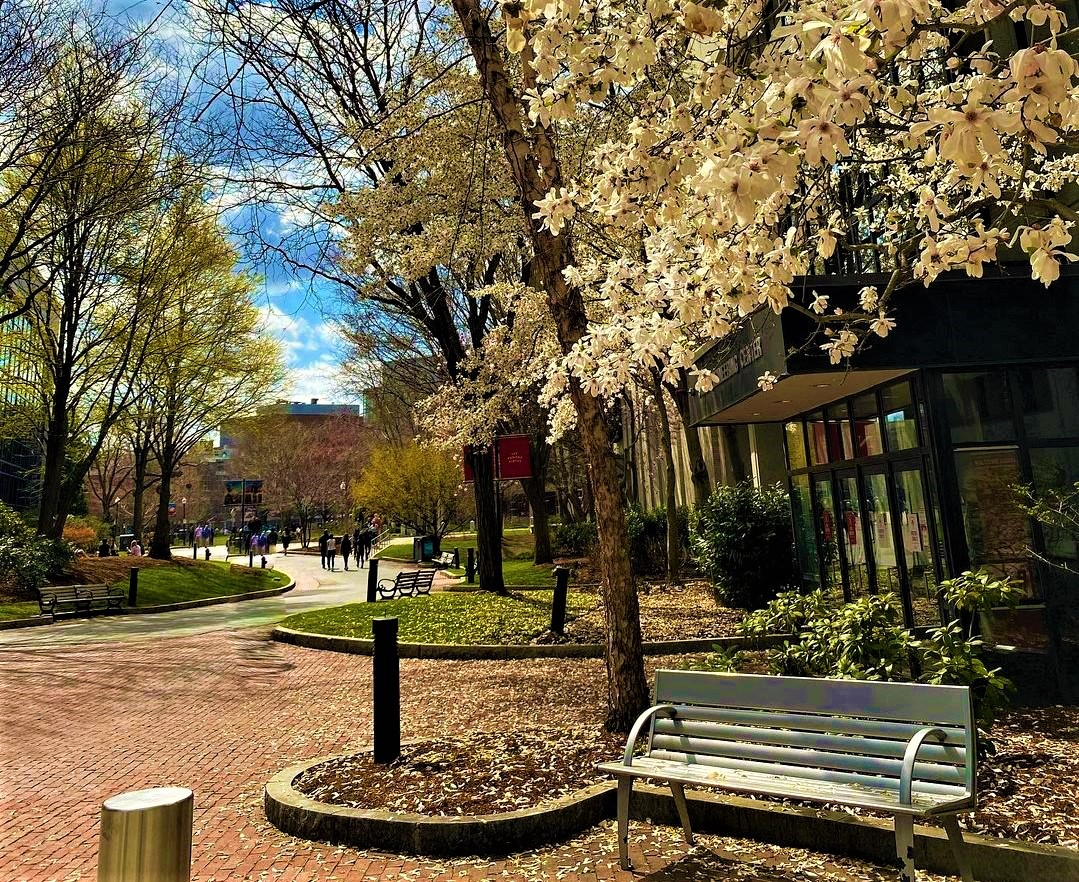
Northeastern University campus in the spring.

Northeastern has a Gold rating in the Sustainability Tracking, Assessment & Rating System (STARS) from the Association for the Advancement of Sustainability in Higher Education (AASHE) for its environmental sustainability efforts and engagement. Northeastern's STARS report states that Northeastern is the only university in Boston with an accredited arboretum, including over 100 different plant species. Northeastern also hosts a unique annual Sustainability Innovation Week and is on track for its zero carbon emissions goal. In 2011, the GreenMetric World University ranking evaluated Northeastern as the second greenest university in the world, and first in the US. Northeastern placed first in the rankings again in 2014.

In accordance with a Boston zoning code amendment in 2007, International Village residence hall was certified as a LEED Gold building in 2010. Dockser Hall was the first building on campus to achieve LEED certification, also Gold, with the completion of its renovation in 2010. East Village was rated LEED Silver in 2016, and the Interdisciplinary Science and Engineering Complex was rated LEED Gold in 2018. LightView was rated LEED Platinum in 2021, becoming the first private student housing LEED Platinum building in Boston. EXP was rated LEED Platinum in 2024.

In 2004, Northeastern was awarded the gold medal by the Massachusetts Horticultural Society for its Dedham Campus.

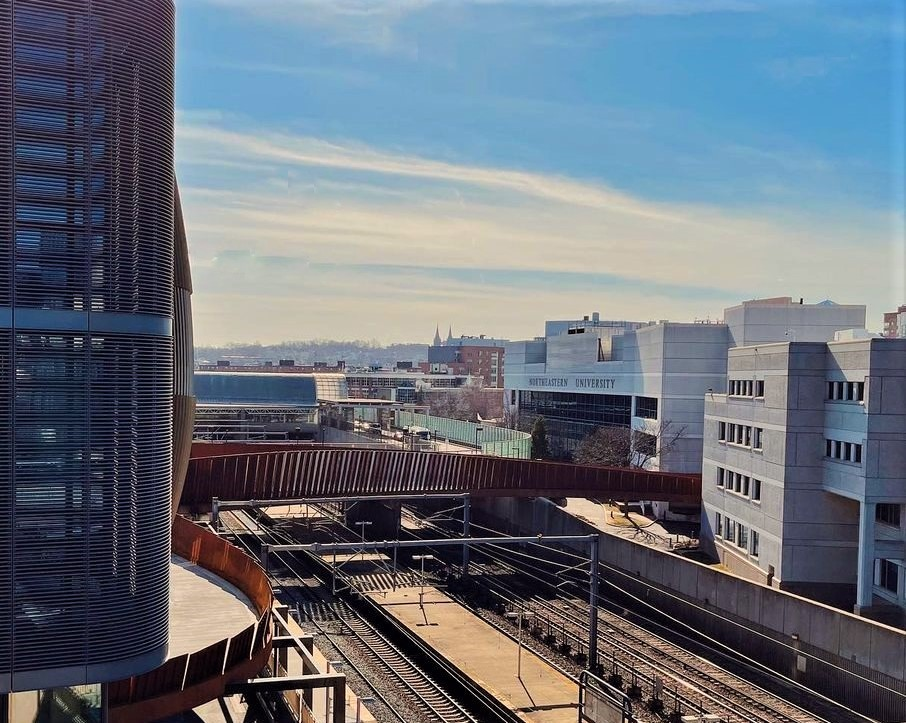
A pedestrian bridge, spanning five MBTA and Amtrak rail lines, connects the Huntington Avenue and Columbus Avenue sides of the Boston campus.

=== Public transportation ===
The MBTA subway Orange Line and Green Line E branch pass through the Northeastern campus. The university is centrally served by stations Ruggles on the Orange Line and Northeastern University on the Green Line. Ruggles station is also served by the Needham, Providence/Stoughton, and Franklin/Foxboro Lines of the MBTA Commuter Rail system and is a major transfer point for MBTA bus routes. Massachusetts Avenue on the Orange Line and Symphony and Museum of Fine Arts on the Green Line serve the outskirts of the campus. The Green Line is also paralleled by MBTA bus route 39.

=== Landmarks ===
==== Centers and commons ====
Facing Huntington Avenue, Krentzman Quadrangle is the main quadrangle on the campus of Northeastern. It is recognizable by the "Northeastern University" brick sign in front. The quad lies at the heart of the original campus between Ell, Dodge and Richards halls, and serves as a gathering space for community members and outdoor activities. It was named after Harvey Krentzman, a businessman and 1949 alumnus.

Centennial Common is a lawn created to mark the 100th anniversary of Northeastern University in 1998. The grassy area borders Shillman Hall, Ryder Hall, Meserve Hall, Leon Street, Forsyth Street and Ruggles Station, and serves as a gateway to the West Campus. The area is a popular gathering spot frequently used by students for recreational purposes and outdoor activities by student organizations.

The Marino Recreation Center, named after 1961 alumnus Roger Marino, co-founder of EMC Corporation, is an indoor fitness center that opened in the fall of 1996.

==== Halls and auditoriums ====
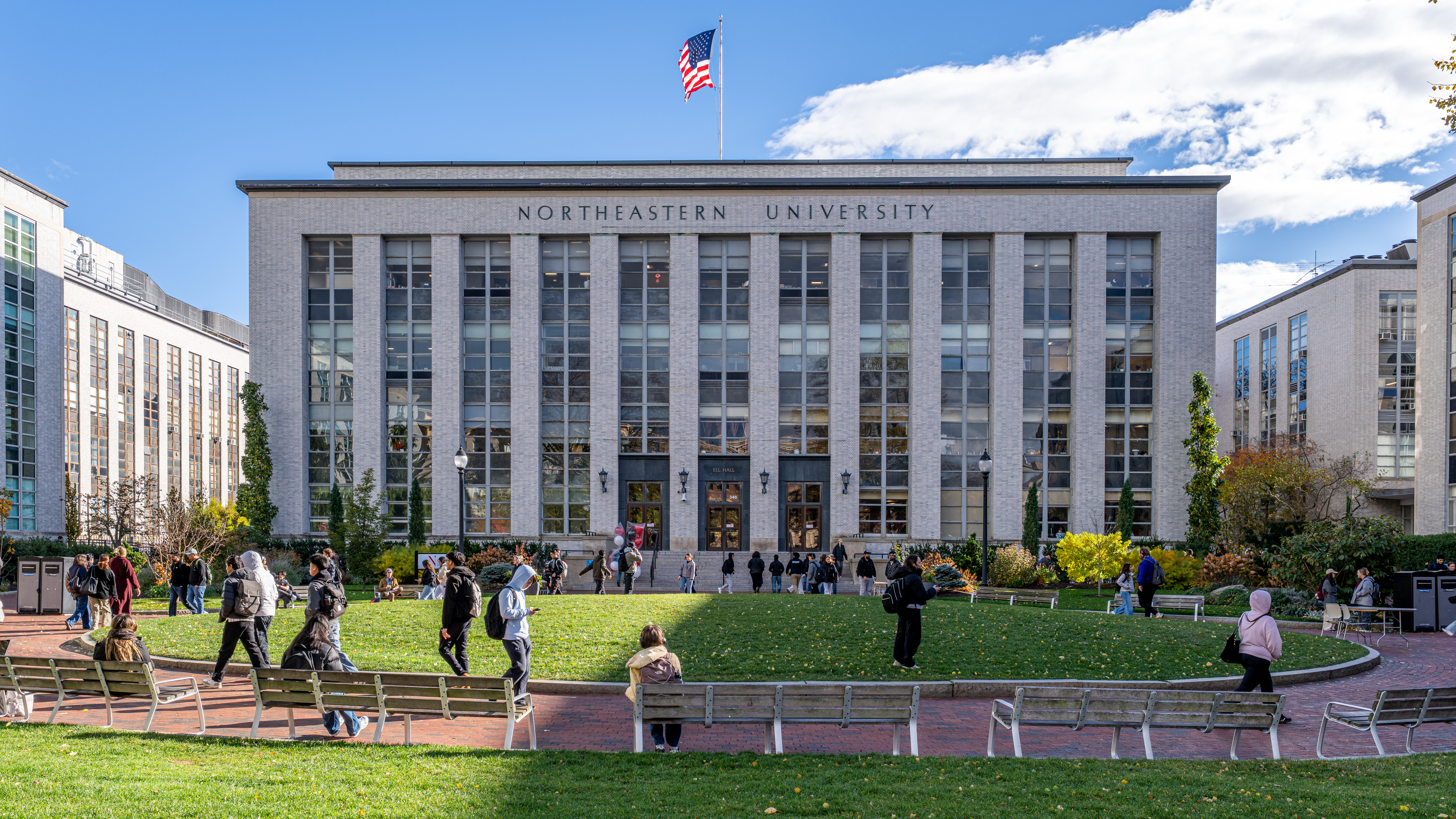
View of Ell Hall, constructed in 1947.

Ell Hall, completed in 1947, is one of the oldest buildings on campus and is centered on Krentzman Quadrangle. It contains administrative offices, classrooms, art display space, a 992-seat auditorium and the Northeastern Bookstore. Like Dodge Hall, Ell Hall has five floors and also connects to the tunnel network. The tunnels interconnect the major administrative and traditional academic buildings for use in inclement weather. Ell Hall was named for Carl Ell, president of Northeastern from 1940 to 1959, who is credited with expanding the campus and making cooperative education an integral part of the university-wide curriculum.

Blackman Auditorium, Northeastern's largest event space, hosts many different types of events for classes, theater groups, dance teams, musical groups, choral groups, fraternities, sororities, and orchestral ensembles. Blackman has hosted many talented individuals from Maya Angelou to Seth Meyers.

Gallery 360 is Northeastern University's art gallery, which is free and open to the public throughout the year. The 1,000-square-foot (93 m^{2}) space houses temporary exhibits of artworks by visiting artists, students, faculty, and the surrounding community. Some larger exhibits also include the adjacent hallways for additional space. Curation and administration is under the supervision of the College of Arts Media and Design (CAMD).

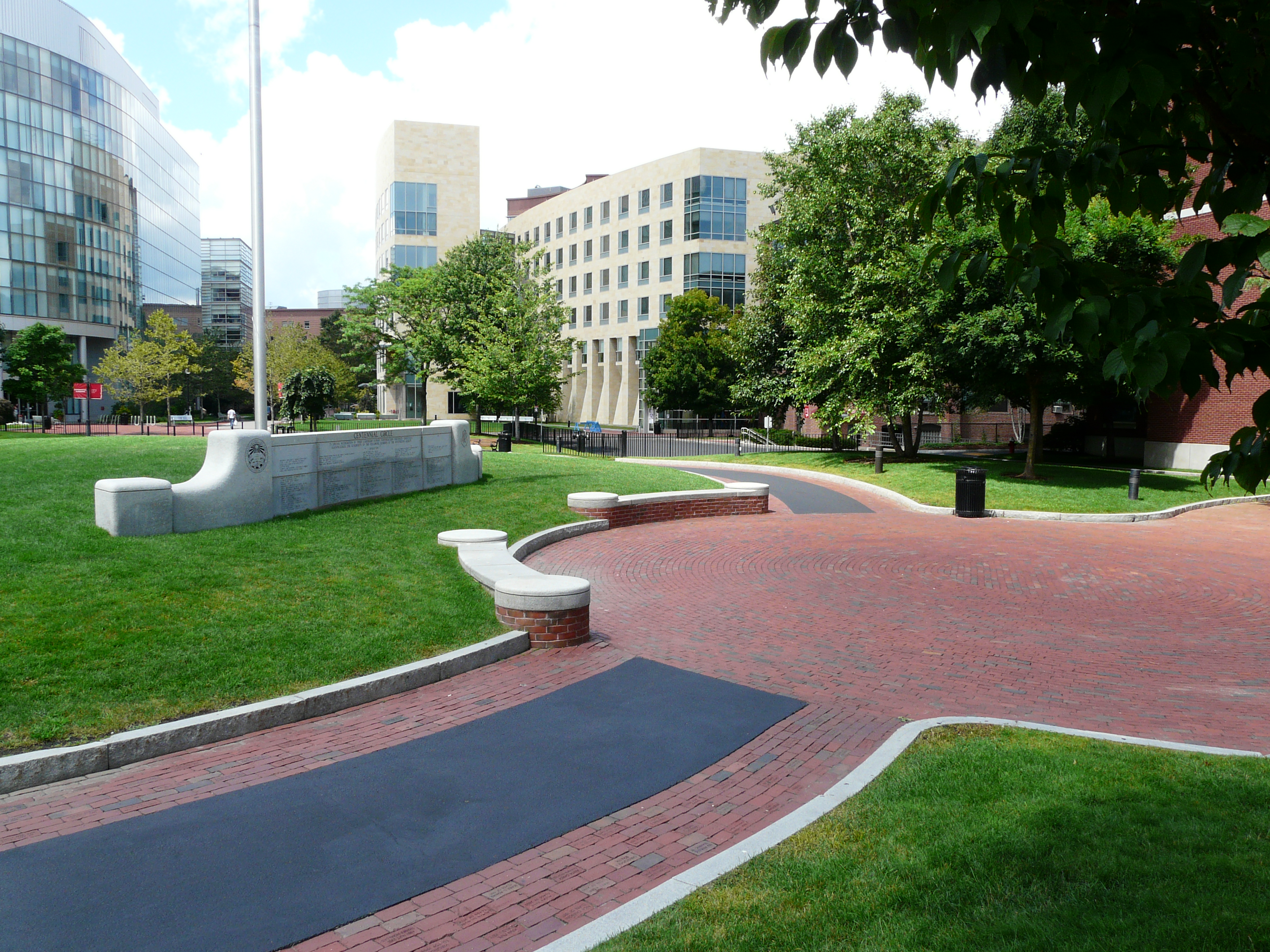
Centennial Common

Dodge Hall sits on Krentzman Quadrangle and primarily serves as the home of Northeastern's D'Amore-McKim School of Business. The building was completed in 1952 and named for Robert Gray Dodge, a former chairman of Northeastern's board of trustees. It has five floors. From 1953 until Snell Library opened in 1990, Dodge Hall's basement served as the university's main library. Richards Hall borders Krentzman Quadrangle and was the first building constructed on campus in October 1938. Its light gray brick and vertical window strips design was the work of alumnus Herman Voss and was replicated in other surrounding buildings. Richards Hall was named for Boston industrialist James Lorin Richards, a former board trustee.

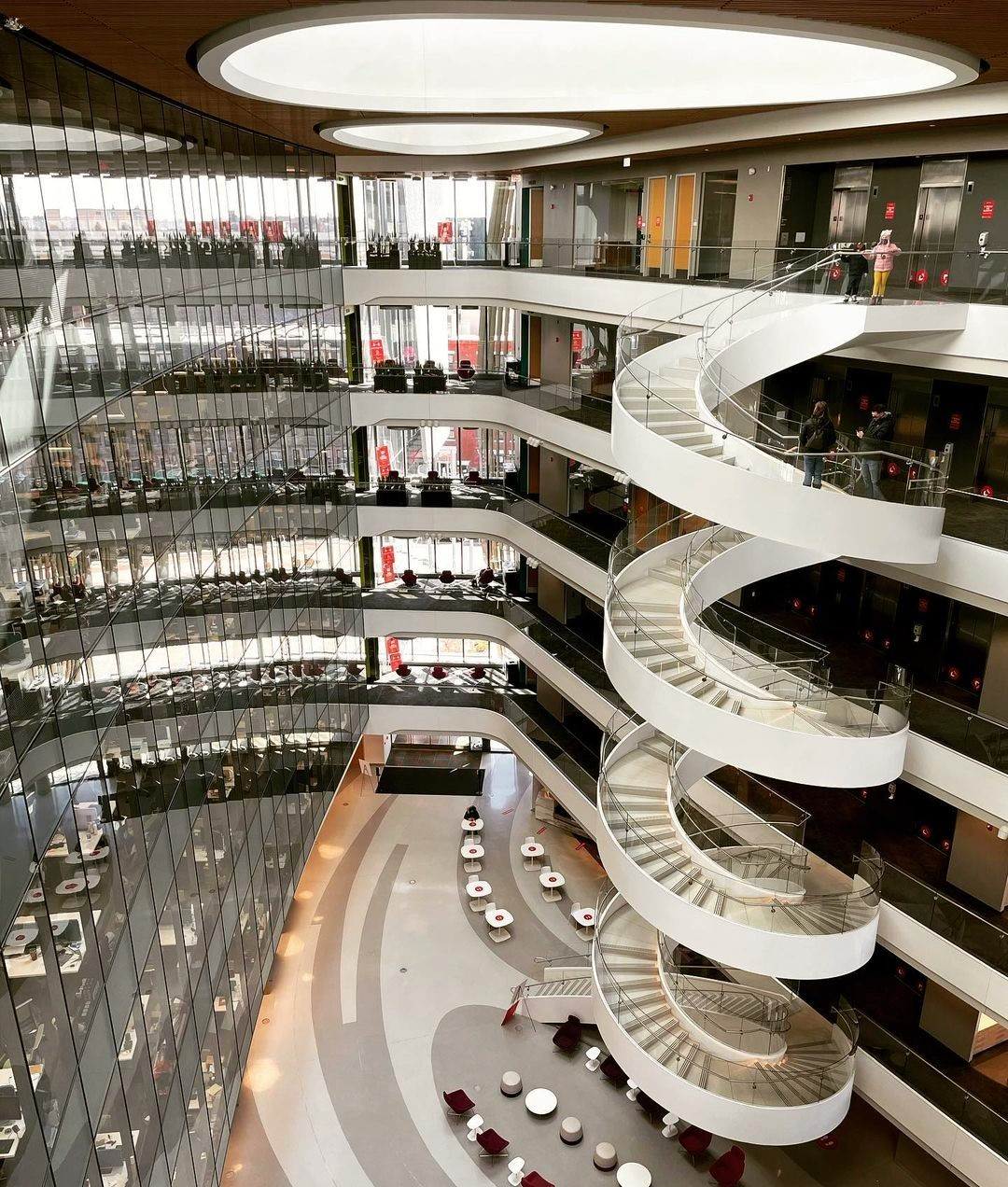
Interior of the Interdisciplinary Science & Engineering Complex (ISEC).

==== Interdisciplinary Science & Engineering Complex ====
On February 21, 2014, Northeastern had its groundbreaking ceremony for the new Interdisciplinary Science & Engineering Complex (ISEC) on Columbus Avenue. Completed in 2017, the 220,000-square-foot (20,000 m^{2}) building provides research and educational space for students and faculty from the College of Science, Bouvé College of Health Sciences, College of Engineering, and Khoury College of Computer Sciences. ISEC received the 2018 Harleston Parker Medal, recognizing it as the most beautiful building or structure in Boston. The following year, the building won an AIA Cote Top 10 Award. The centerpiece of the complex includes a large atrium, a spiral staircase, and a 280-seat auditorium.

==== Matthews Arena ====
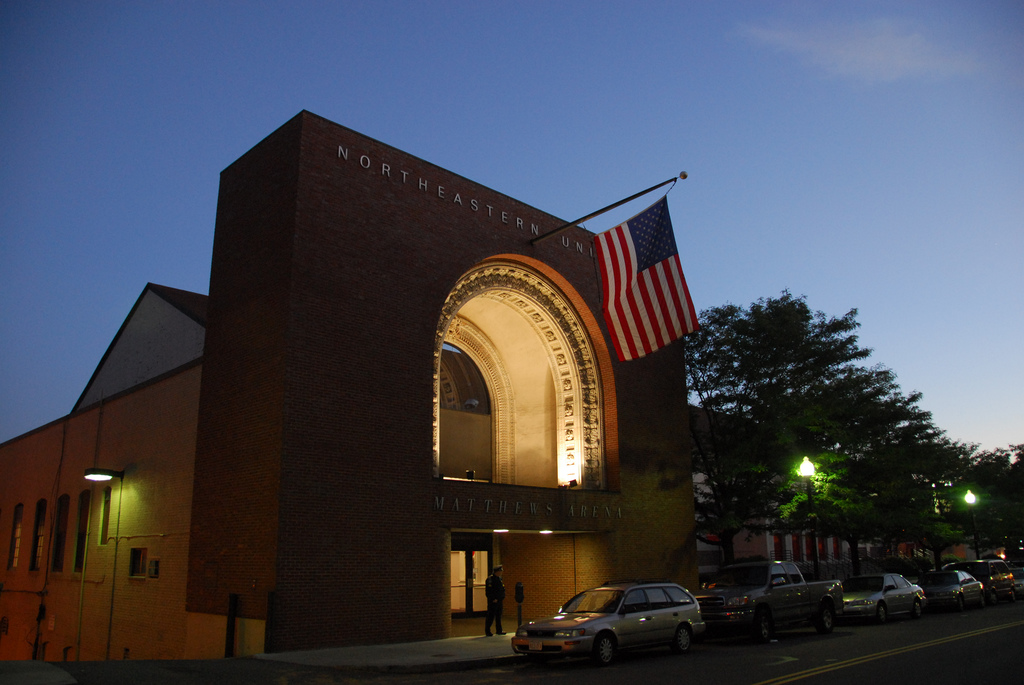
Matthews Arena, home to Northeastern's hockey and basketball teams.

Opened in 1910 and originally known as the Boston Arena, Matthews Arena was the world's oldest surviving indoor ice hockey arena at the time of its closing. Located on the eastern edge of Northeastern University's campus, it was home to the Northeastern Huskies men's and women's hockey teams, and men's basketball team as well as the Wentworth Institute of Technology's men's hockey team. The arena was named after former university Board of Trustees Chairman George J. Matthews, a 1956 graduate, and his wife, the late Hope M. Matthews, who helped fund a major renovation in 1982. The arena was the original home of the NHL Boston Bruins and the WHA New England Whalers (now the NHL Carolina Hurricanes). It was also the secondary home to the NBA Boston Celtics in the 1940s. It hosted all or part of the America East Conference men's basketball tournament a total of seven times and hosted the 1960 Frozen Four. The arena also served as the original home to the annual Beanpot tournament between Boston's four major college hockey programs. The arena was demolished in the winter of 2026.

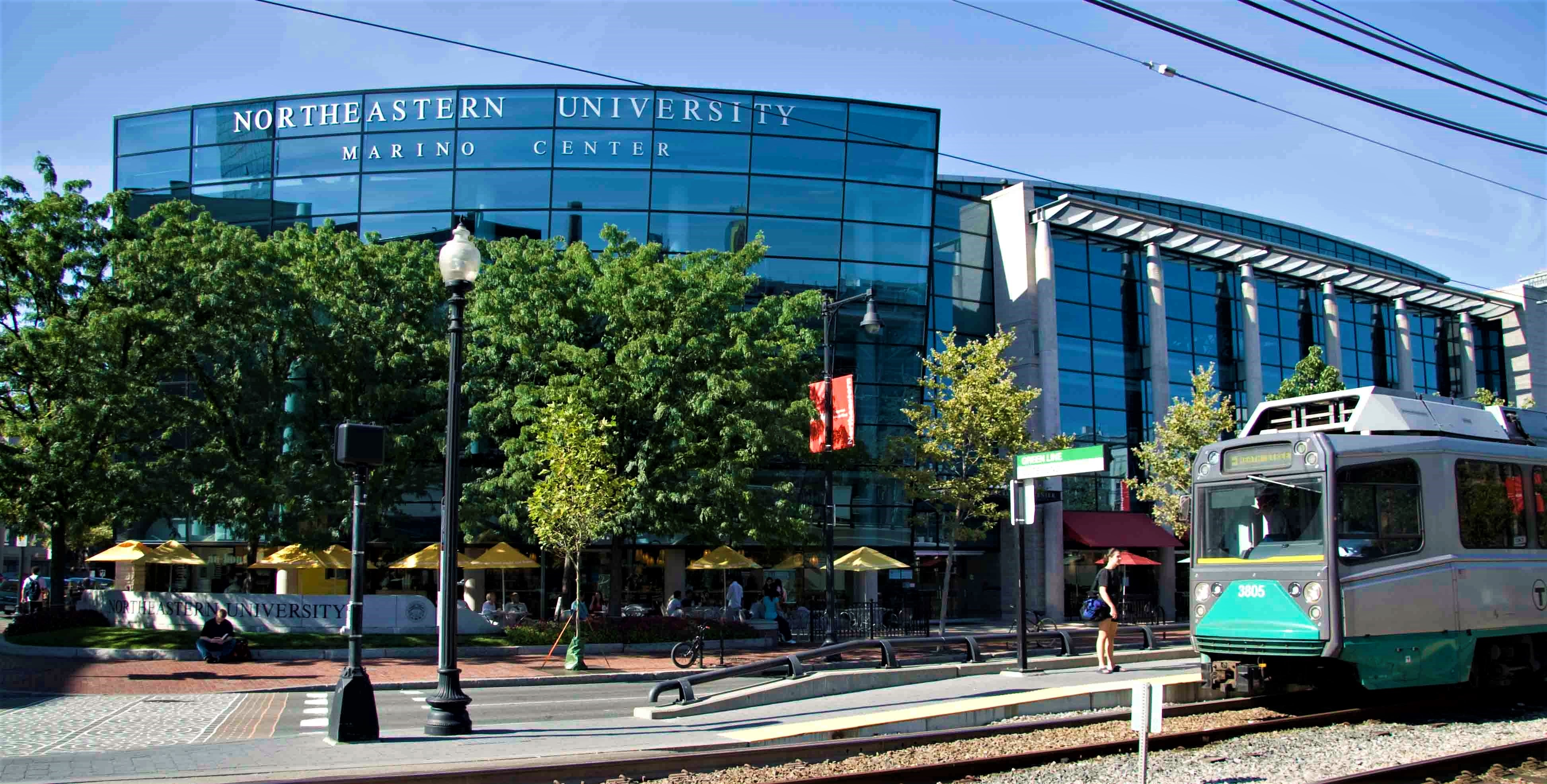
Marino Recreation Center, completed in 1996.

==== Dorms and housing ====
West Village H was awarded the 2005 Harleston Parker Medal by the Boston Society of Architects (BSA), recognizing the most beautiful building in the metropolitan Boston area.

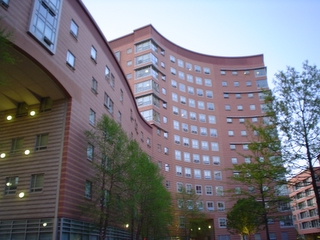
West Village A North residence hall

In 2008, West Village F was recognized in American Institute of Architects New England 2008 Merit Awards for Design Excellence.

A new 23 story dorm will open at 840 Columbus Avenue in 2028, providing housing for an additional 1,370 students.

==== South Campus (Columbus Avenue) ====
Northeastern's southernmost section of campus is located along Columbus Avenue in Roxbury, parallel to the Orange line. The university expanded south into Roxbury at the same time as they were building West Village. In 2001, Davenport Commons was opened, providing 585 students housing in two residence halls while 75 families representing a range of incomes have been able to purchase a condo or townhouse at or below Boston's market value. Davenport Commons also created commercial space on Tremont Street.

International Village opened in 2009 at the corner of Tremont Street and Ruggles Street. It consists of three interconnected residential towers, an office tower, an administration building, and a gym. A 600-seat dining hall is available to all members of the Northeastern community.

LightView opened in 2019, developed and financed by American Campus Communities exclusively for Northeastern students as Boston's first developer-led, equity-financed student housing project. The building is 21 stories tall and includes a fitness area as well as social and recreational spaces.

==== Library facilities ====
Northeastern University Libraries include the Snell Library and the John D. O'Bryant African-American Institute Library. The NU School of Law Library is separately administered by the NU School of Law. The NU Libraries received federal depository designation in 1963.

Snell Library opened in 1990 at a cost of $35 million. It is also home to the Northeastern University Archives and Special Collections department, which includes the Benjamin LaGuer papers collection. The Special Collections focus on records of Boston-area community-based organizations that are concerned with social justice issues. In June 2016, the library staff adopted an open-access policy to make its members' professional research publicly accessible online. In 2025, Northeastern completed a two-year renovation of Snell Library, modernizing the facility with a wrap-around glass exterior and a sustainable rooftop solar panel system.

== Network campuses ==
The university operates a number of satellite locations in Massachusetts, including the George J. Kostas Research Institute in Burlington, a Financial District campus in the Hilton Hotel near Faneuil Hall in downtown Boston, a Dedham Campus in Dedham, and a Marine Science Center in Nahant. The Kostas Research Institute for Homeland Security, which opened in 2011, contains the Laboratory for Structural Testing of Resilient and Sustainable Systems (STReSS Laboratory). The laboratory is "equipped to test full-scale and large-scale structural systems and materials to failure so as to explore the development of new strategies for designing, simulating, and sensing structural and infrastructure systems".

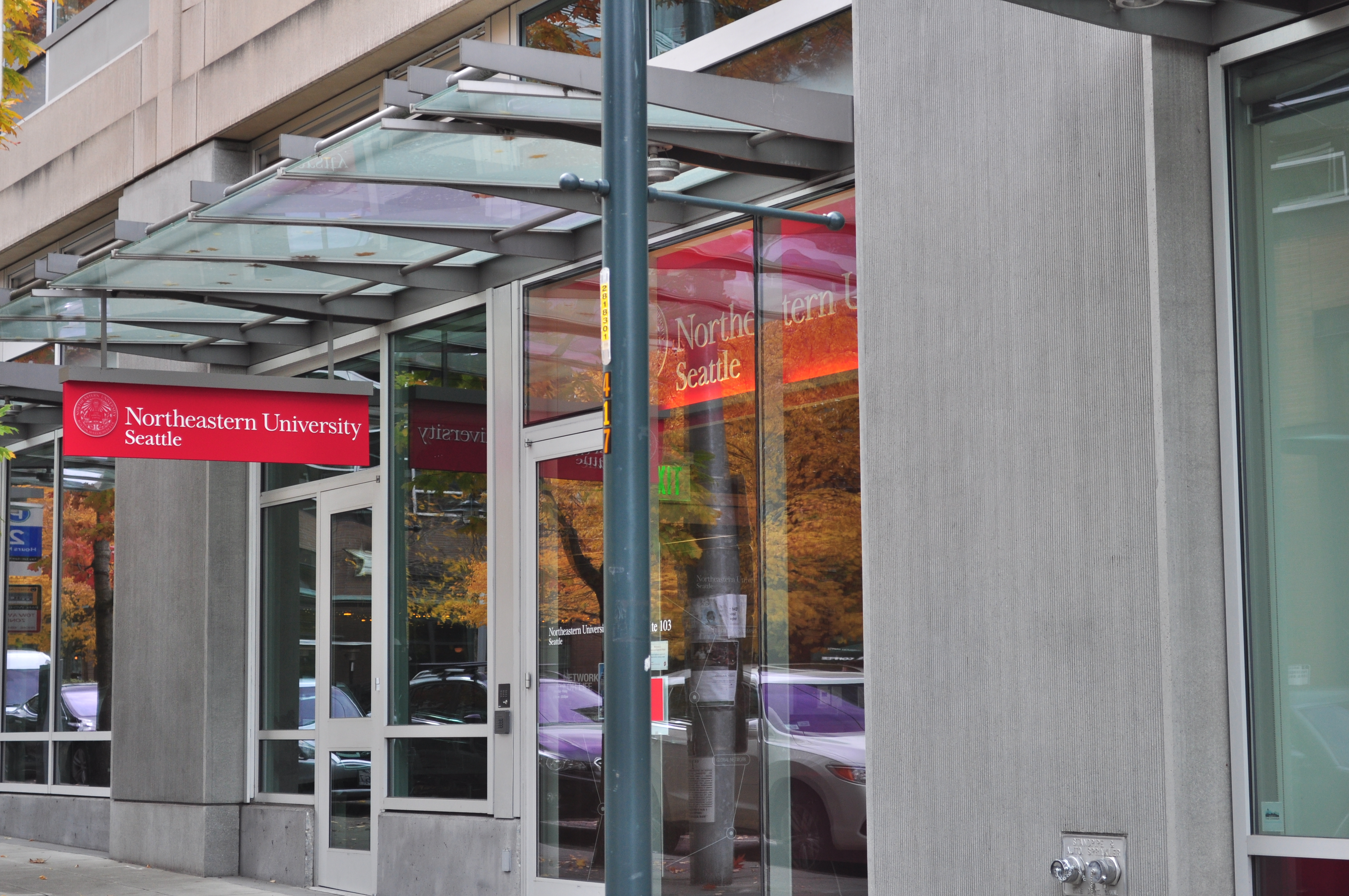
Photo of Northeastern University satellite campus in Seattle, Washington

The university has also launched a number of full-service remote network campuses in North America, including in Charlotte, North Carolina, in October 2011, Seattle, in January 2013, San Jose, California, in March 2015, Toronto, in 2016 and Vancouver, British Columbia, in 2019. In January 2020, Northeastern announced that it was opening the Roux Institute in Portland, Maine, a new research institute focused on artificial intelligence and machine learning in digital and life sciences. The decision came after Northeastern was selected for a $100 million donation by David Roux, in hopes of turning the city into a new tech hub and in an attempt to spark economic growth in the region.

More recently, the university has continued to focus on global expansion. In late 2018, Northeastern announced the acquisition of the New College of the Humanities, a small private London-based college founded by the philosopher A. C. Grayling. The move was seen as unorthodox, as most U.S. colleges have typically chosen to build new campus branches abroad, rather than purchasing existing ones.

On July 1, 2022, Mills College in Oakland, California, was renamed to Mills College at Northeastern University through a merger between the university and the liberal arts college, which had financial troubles.

On May 29, 2024, Northeastern and Marymount Manhattan College in New York City announced a merger that will create Northeastern University – New York City. The merger was finalized in the summer of 2026.

== Student life ==
Undergraduates at Northeastern matriculate from all 50 states, with around 20% from the state of Massachusetts. The next-largest feeder states are New York, New Jersey, California, Connecticut, and Pennsylvania.

Northeastern has more than 18 varsity teams competing in the NCAA, over 30 club sports teams and over 400 student clubs and organizations. Among the student-run organizations are: Fraternity and Sorority Life (FSL), Student Government Association (SGA), Resident Student Association (RSA), The Huntington News, Northeastern Television (NUTV), Social Justice Resource Center (SJRC), and the Council for University Programs (CUP).

Northeastern hosts six student-run a cappella groups on campus: three mixed ensembles (Distilled Harmony, The Downbeats, and The Nor'easters), two treble ensembles (Pitch, Please! and Treble on Huntington), and one TTBB ensemble (UniSons). All groups regularly compete in the International Championship of Collegiate A Cappella (ICCA). The Nor'easters have performed at ICCA finals in New York City three times and won the ICCA title in 2013 and 2017. Pitch, Please! competed at ICCA finals in 2019, 2023, and 2025.

=== Student government ===
The Northeastern University Student Government Association (SGA) is the representative body for undergraduate students on the Boston campus. The SGA is composed of students from various majors and is organized into three branches: Legislative, Executive, and Judicial. The Executive Branch includes the student body president and executive vice president who are elected by the undergraduate student body each academic year.

Northeastern hosts additional student organizations centered around politics and government. Among these are College Democrats, College Republicans, Educational Freedom Project, YDSA, and more.

=== Athletics ===
Since 1927, Northeastern University's intercollegiate athletic teams have been known as the Huskies. Prior to 1927, Northeastern had no official mascot. In February 1927, a pup was selected from legendary Iditarod Trail Sled Dog Race competitor Leonhard Seppala's kennel. On March 4, 1927, King Husky I arrived at Northeastern in a campus celebration. Live mascots until King Husky VII died in 1989 and the university could not find a replacement. In 2005, the university resumed the live mascot tradition; the current live mascot is named Moses. The university's official costumed mascot is Paws.

The university's official colors are Northeastern red and black, with white often used as an alternate color. The university fight song, "All Hail, Northeastern," was composed by Charles A. Pethybridge, class of 1932. 18 Northeastern varsity sports teams compete in NCAA Division I's Colonial Athletic Association (CAA).

During its first decades, Northeastern initially had seven athletics teams: basketball, cross country, indoor track, outdoor track, crew and football.

Northeastern sponsors the following sports teams:

- (M) Baseball
- (M), (W) Basketball
- (M), (W) Cross country
- (W) Field hockey
- (M), (W) Ice hockey (in Hockey East)
- (M), (W) Rowing (in Eastern Association of Rowing Colleges and Eastern Association of Women's Rowing Colleges)
- (M), (W) Soccer
- (W) Swimming and diving
- (M), (W) Track and field
- (W) Volleyball

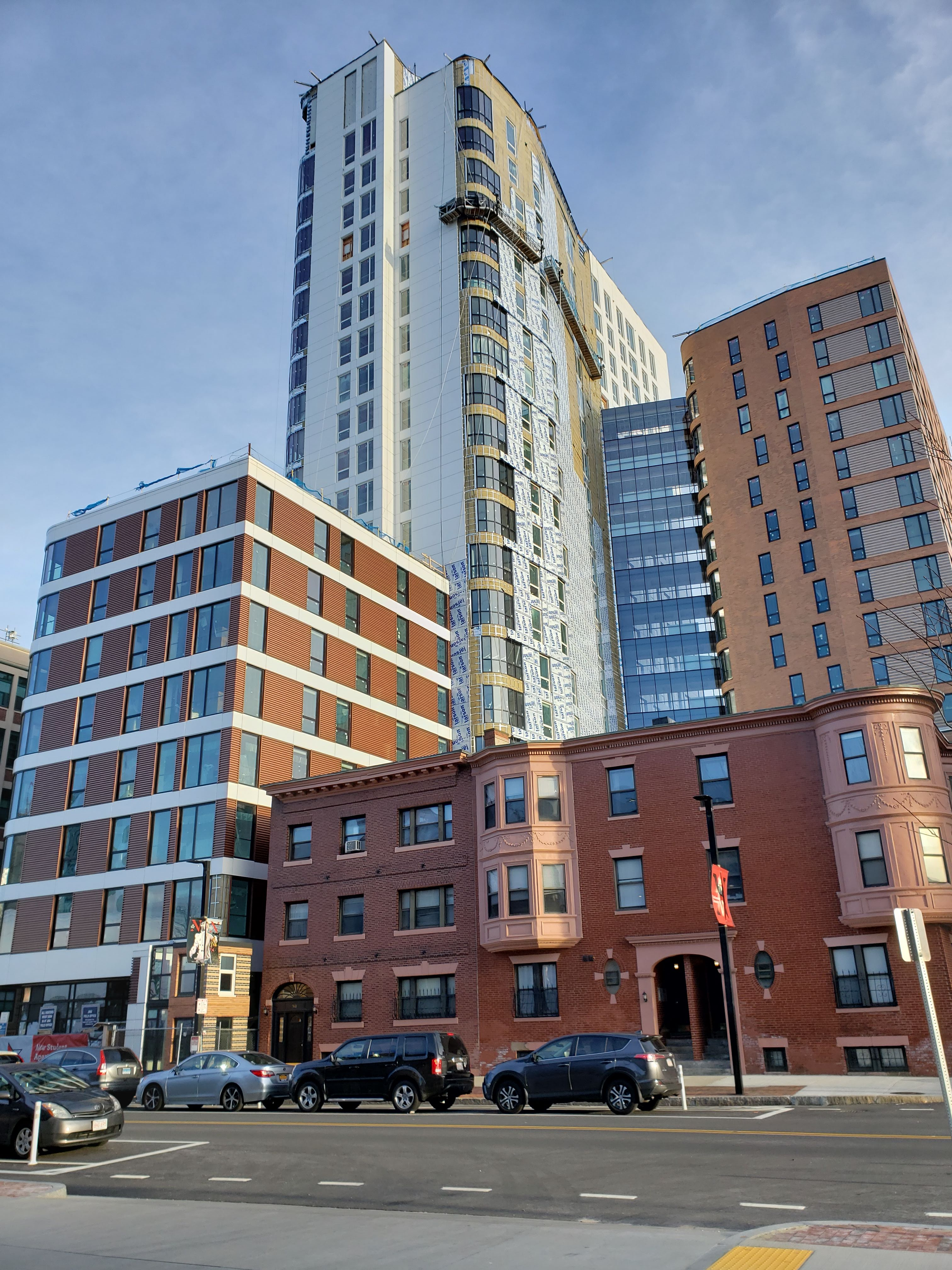
LightView apartments under construction in 2019

Matthews Arena, which opened in 1910, is home to the hockey and basketball programs. The 4,666-seat arena is located close to campus, just off Massachusetts Avenue. It is considered the world's oldest multi-purpose athletic building. Henderson Boathouse is home to the Huskies' men's & women's rowing squads. The Henderson Boathouse is located on the Charles River near Soldiers Field Road in Allston. The university also maintains the Cabot Physical Education Center, which opened in 1954 and includes a basketball court; an indoor track and natatorium; the 10,755 square feet (999.2 m^{2}) Gries Center for Sports Medicine and Performance Center; a squash facility; and the William E. Carter Playground, a renovated community park on Columbus Avenue.

The baseball team was founded in 1921 and has since competed in one College World Series and played in the NCAA regionals seven times.

In 2008, the Rowing team made the Intercollegiate Rowing Association Grand Finals and placed fourth behind University of Wisconsin–Madison, University of Washington, and University of California, Berkeley, while defeating Brown University, Princeton University, University of Pennsylvania and Harvard University.

In 2009, Northeastern eliminated its 74-year-old football program. From 1933 to 2009, the Northeastern Huskies football program's all-time record was 290-365-17 (.444), it produced 20 All-Americans and won the 2002 Atlantic 10 Conference championship. Citing sparse attendance, numerous losing seasons and the expense to renovate Parsons Field to an acceptable standard, the university's board of trustees voted on November 20, 2009, to end the football program. According to President Joseph Aoun, "Leadership requires that we make these choices. This decision allows us to focus on our existing athletic programs."

In addition to intercollegiate athletics, Northeastern offers 40 club sports, including sailing, judo, rugby, lacrosse, Olympic-Style taekwondo, alpine skiing, squash, cycling, and ultimate Frisbee. In 2005, the women's rugby team finished third in the nation in Division II, and the men's rugby team won the largest annual tournament in the United States. Recently, the women's rugby team competed and placed 11th at the Collegiate Rugby Championship. In the 2008–09 academic year, the Northeastern Club Field Hockey and Women's Basketball teams won their respective National Championships. From 2007 to 2009, the Northeastern Club Baseball team won three straight New England Club Baseball Association championships. The Club Taekwondo team placed 1st overall in Division II for the 2018–19 Season in the Eastern Collegiate Taekwondo Conference.

On May 25, 2010, the club baseball team defeated Penn State to win the National Club Baseball Association Division II World Series and the national championship.

=== Ice hockey ===
The men's and women's hockey teams compete in the Hockey East conference. Northeastern defeated Boston College, 4–2, to win the 2019 Beanpot. In 2020, Northeastern beat Boston University, 5–4, in overtime to win the Beanpot for the third year in a row before losing in 2022 in the finals to Boston University. Northeastern also won the 2023 Beanpot in a shootout against Harvard and again in 2024 in a 4–3 OT win against Boston University. In addition to winning the Beanpot title, Northeastern took home both awards, with the award for most valuable player being presented to Adam Gaudette and the Eberly Award being presented to Cayden Primeau, who had a save percentage of .974 (making him the goalie with the second-highest save percentage to win the award in the 44 years the award has been given).

=== Greek life ===
Fraternity and Sorority Life (FSL) at Northeastern includes twelve sororities and thirteen fraternities representing over 4,000 undergraduate students, approximately 17% of the university's undergraduate student population. As of Spring 2026, the average chapter size for Northeastern's National Panhellenic Conference sororities is 208 and the average chapter size for Northeastern's Interfraternity Council fraternities is 110. In 2025, The Huntington News reported record-breaking recruitment numbers for Northeastern University sororities, highlighting a surge in campus engagement. A new sorority joined in spring 2025 and an additional sorority and fraternity are slated to arrive on campus in fall 2027. During the 2024–2025 academic year, chapters completed over 44,000 hours of community service and raised more than $432,000 in philanthropy. Every semester, Northeastern's Interfraternity and Panhellenic Councils host "Greek Sing" and "Take It To The Floor", signature themed dance competitions that raise $200,000 annually for local philanthropies.

=== Traditions ===
==== Greek Sing and Take It To The Floor ====
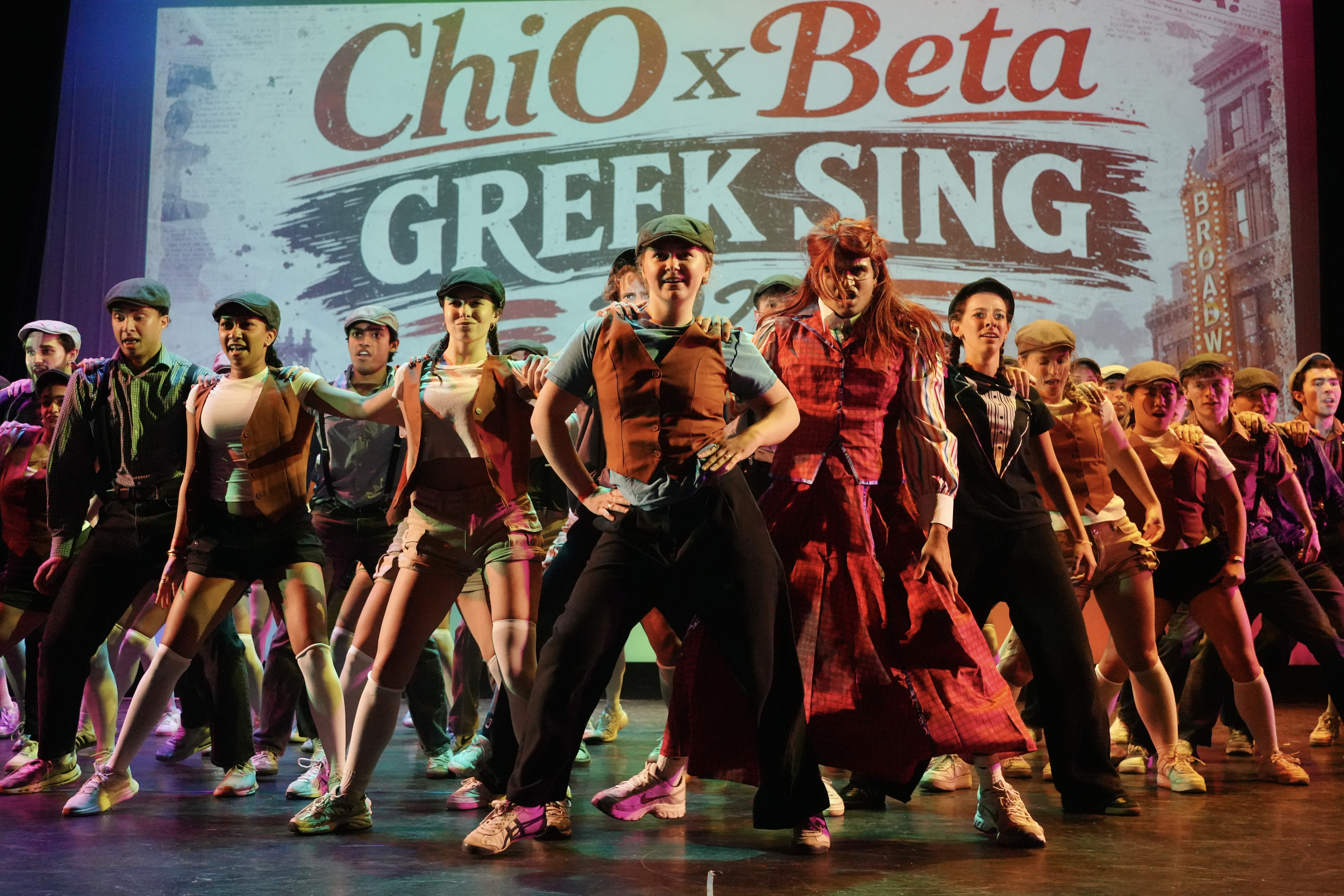
Greek Sing 2026 in Blackman Auditorium

Greek Sing and Take It To The Floor are flagship dance competitions organized by the Northeastern Interfraternity Council and Panhellenic Council, held each spring and fall, respectively, in Blackman Auditorium. Each event randomly pairs every sorority and fraternity on campus, with chapters rehearsing and fundraising throughout the semester to compete in a choreographed performance judged by professional dance industry experts on synchronization, energy, and school spirit. Every semester's performance has an overarching theme; past themes have included Netflix Originals, Fairytales and Fables, Disney Channel Originals, Broadway Musicals, and most recently, Sitcoms. The events have run for over 30 years, serving as the largest Greek life philanthropy event in Massachusetts and the primary showcase for chapter identity at Northeastern.

==== Underwear ("Undie") Run ====
Started in 2005, the Underwear Run is a Northeastern-sponsored event around fall midterm season in which students strip down to their underwear and run a track around campus and near parts of the city. The Northeastern University Police Department (NUPD) supervises the event to maintain the flow of traffic through the city. Students have described it as a "liberating experience" that "brings a sense of community and builds school spirit." Though the event was officially canceled in 2020 and 2021 due to COVID-19 concerns, it was unofficially organized by students in 2021 anyway.

==== Husky Hunt ====
Organized by the Resident Student Association, Husky Hunt is a 24-hour city-wide scavenger hunt that has 50 teams of students roaming around the Greater Boston area in search of locations that correspond to clues, games, puzzles, and riddles. The scavenger hunt starts with a preliminary qualifying quiz of which only 1/3 of the total group of participating teams progress to the hunt.

== Notable people ==
Northeastern University has over 365,000 living alumni based in 187 countries around the world.

=== Alumni ===
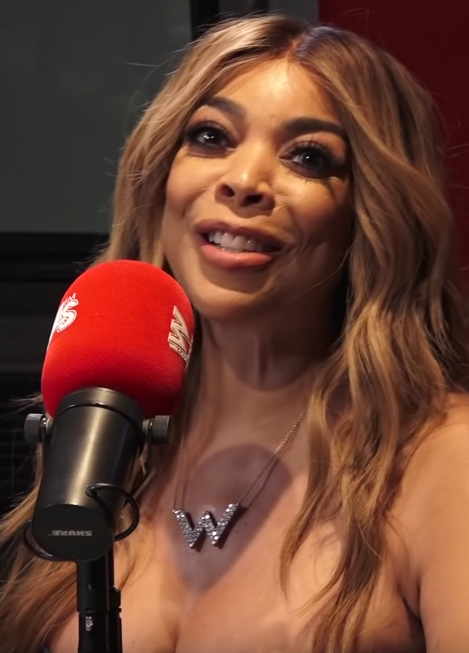
Wendy Williams
television talk show host

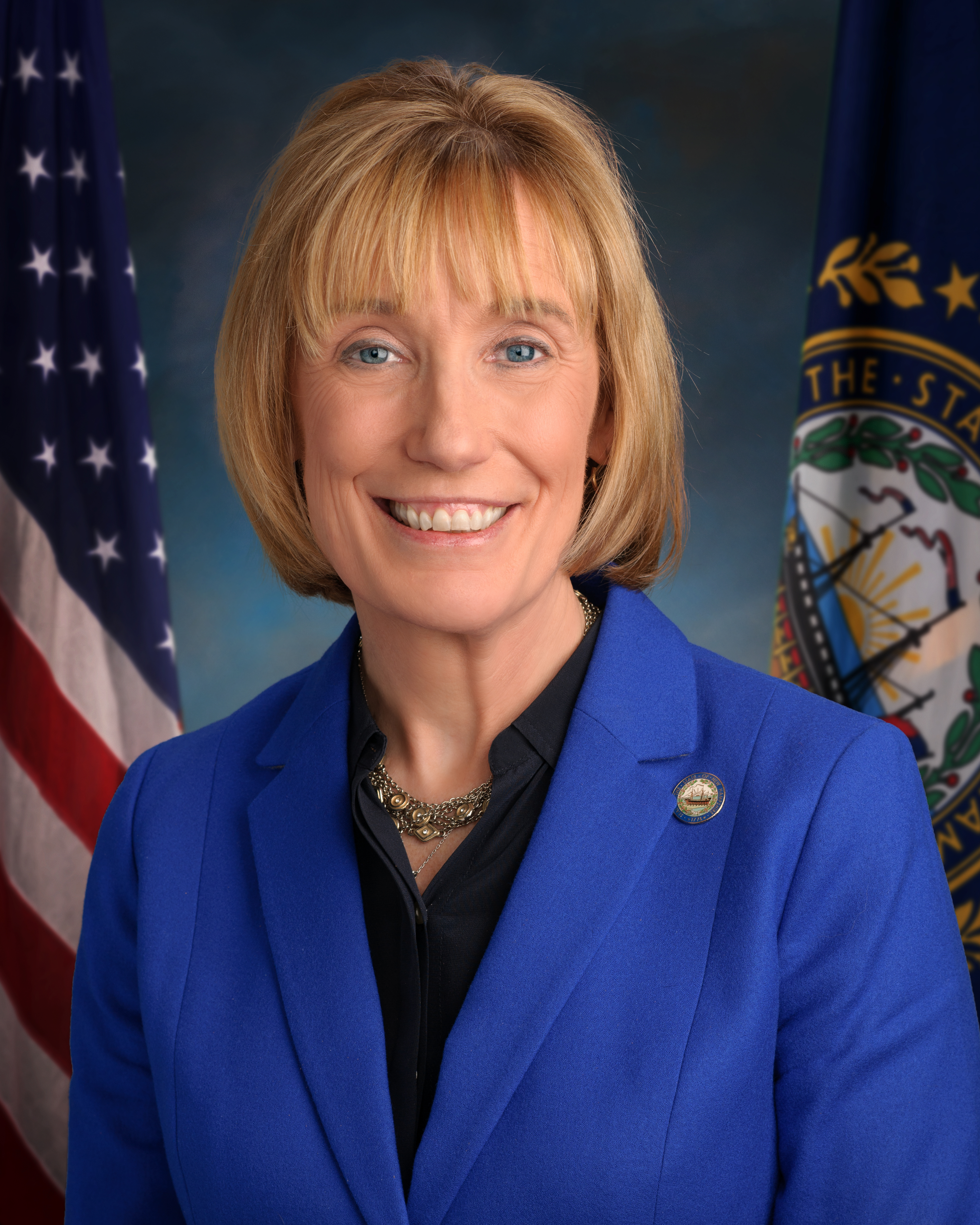
Maggie Hassan
politician

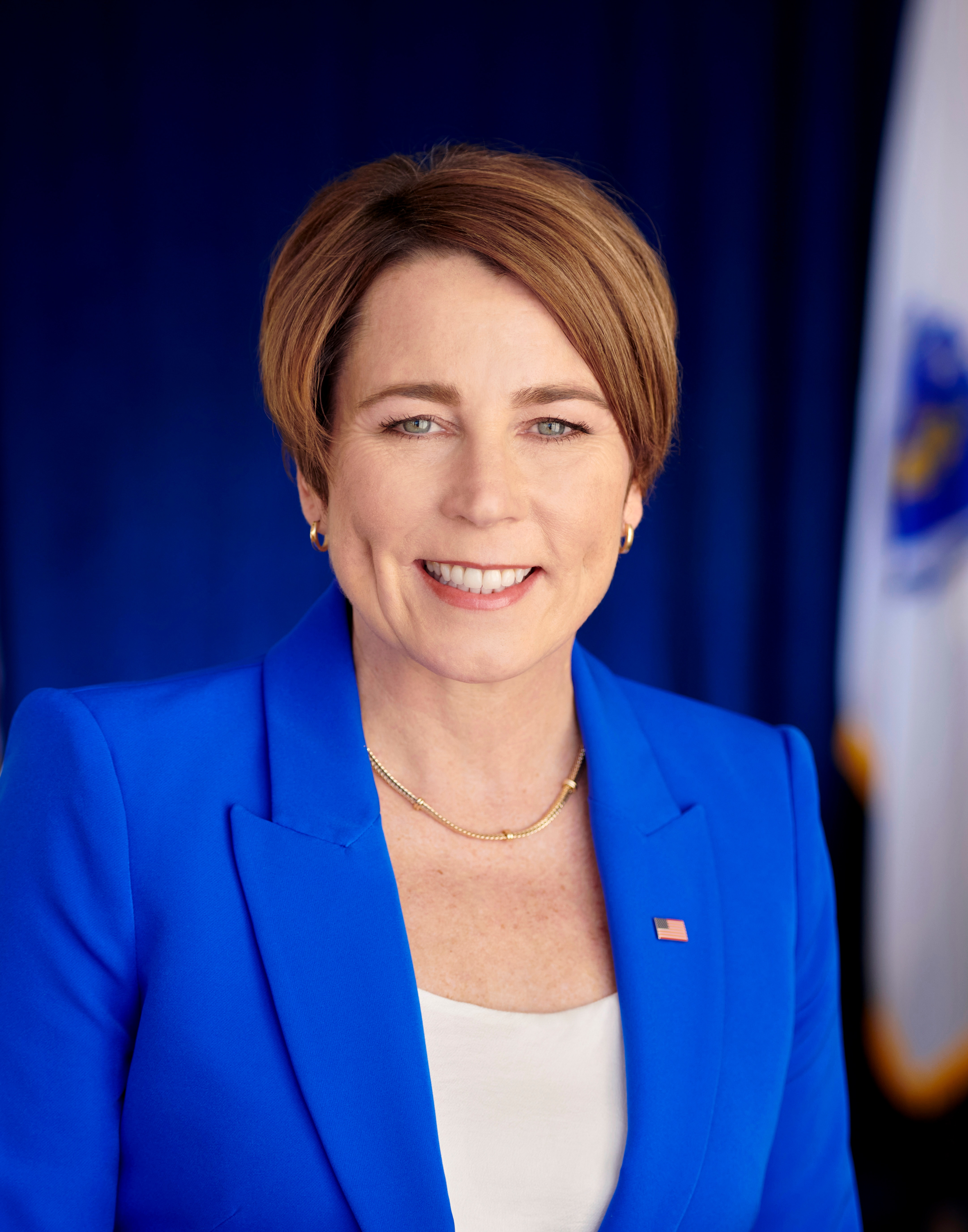
Maura Healey
politician

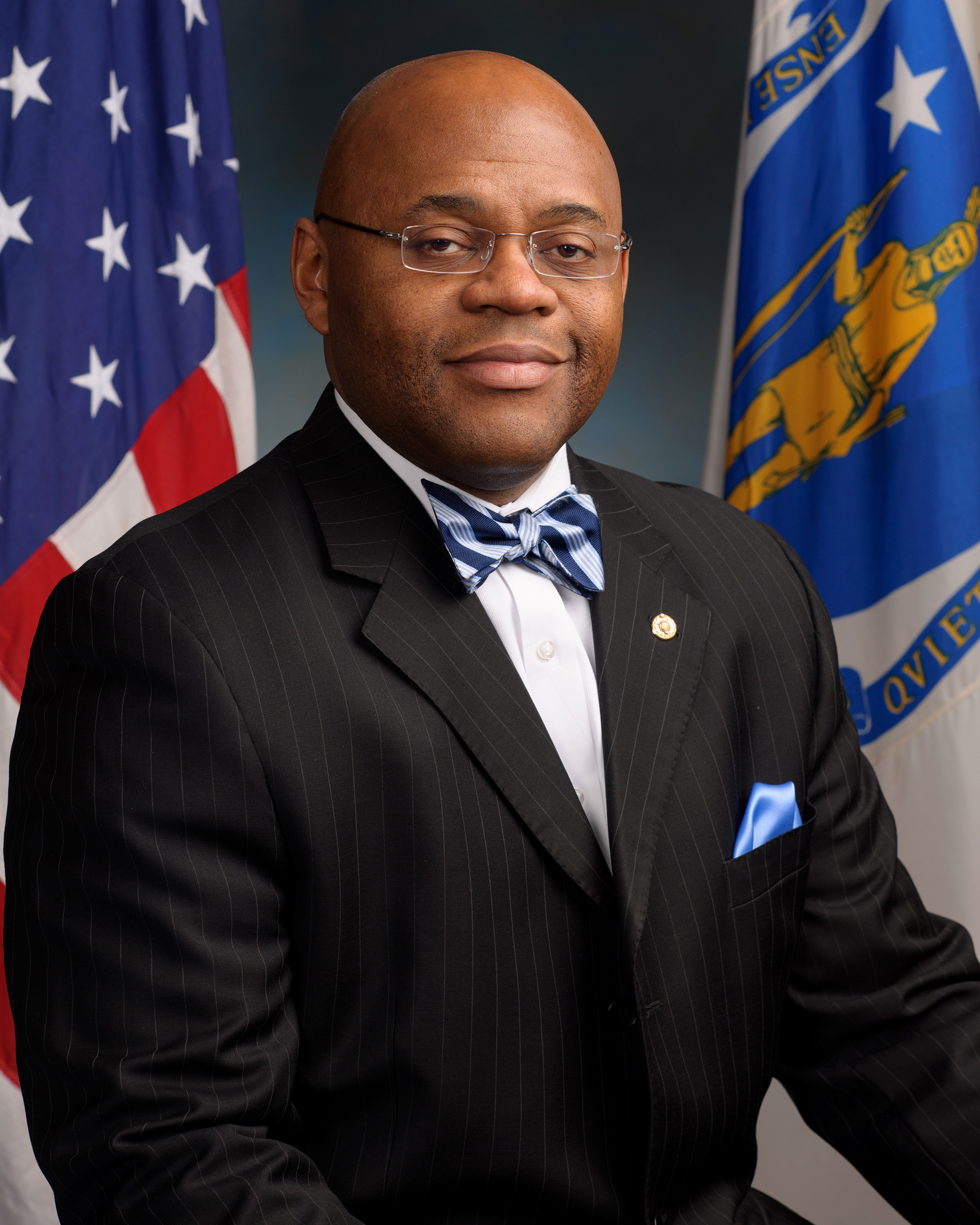
Mo Cowan
politician

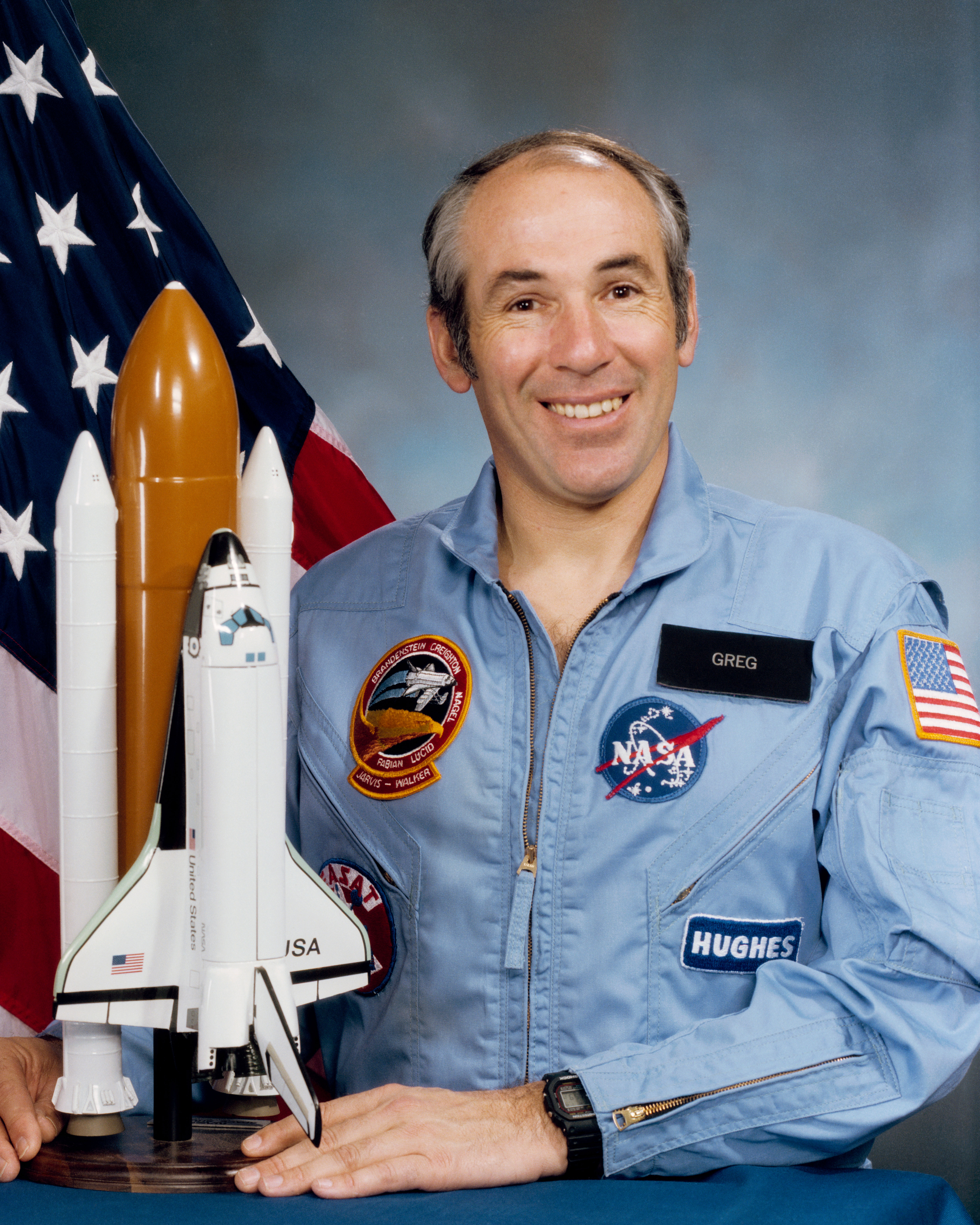
Gregory Jarvis
astronaut

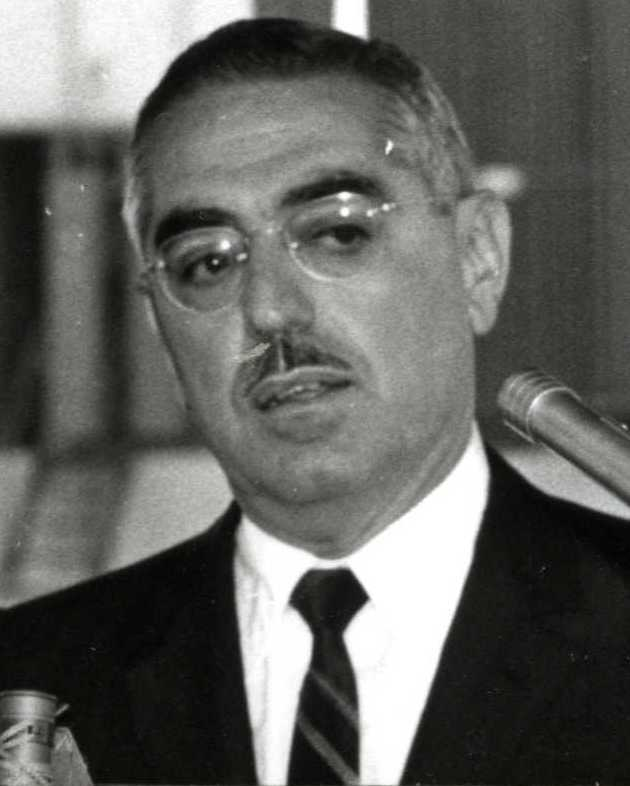
John Pastore
politician

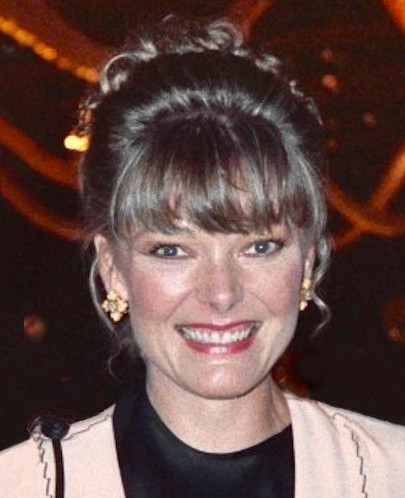
Jane Curtin
actress and comedian

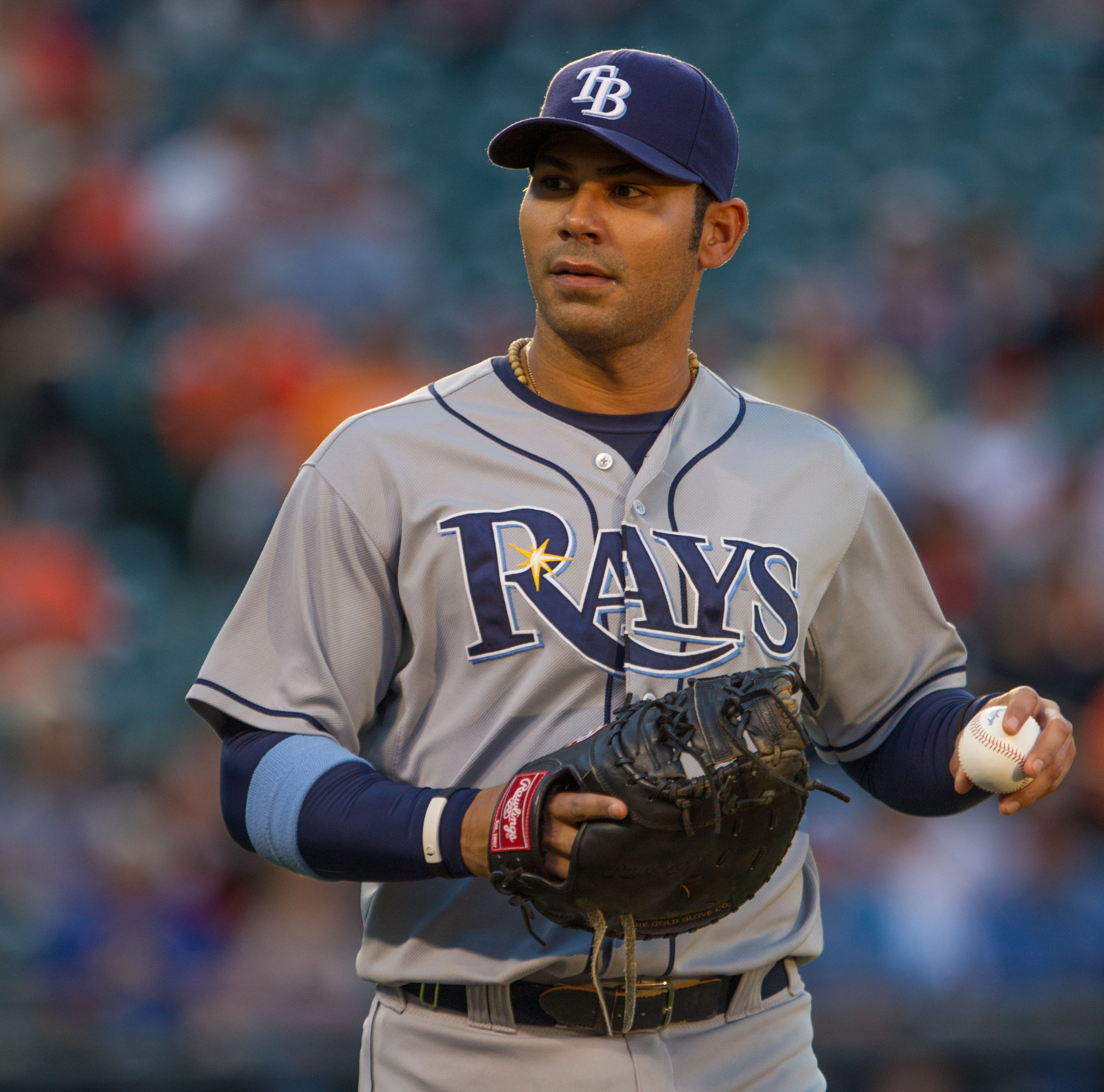
Carlos Peña
professional baseball player

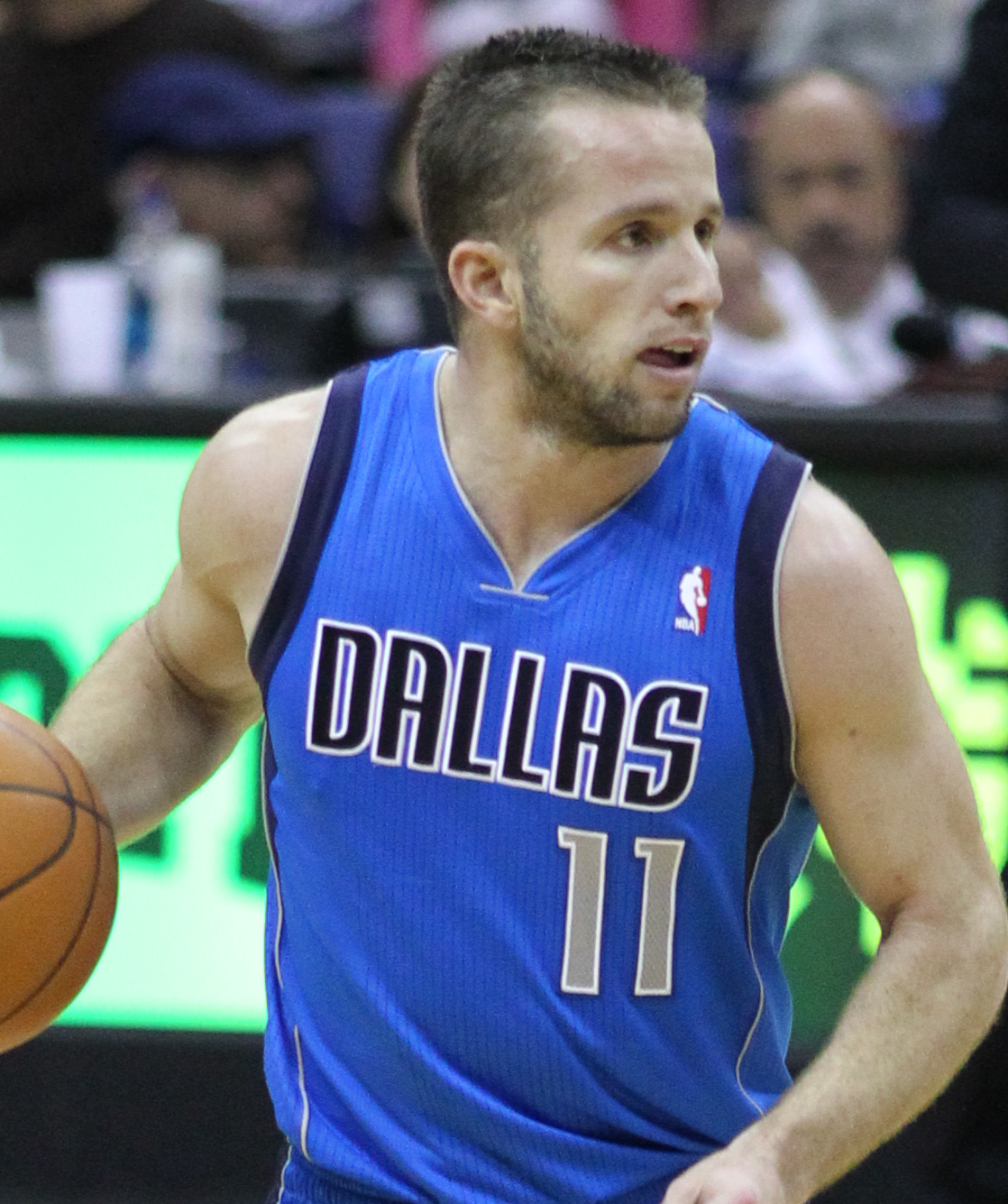
J.J. Barea
professional basketball player

Toby Fox
video game designer

Cam Schlittler professional baseball player

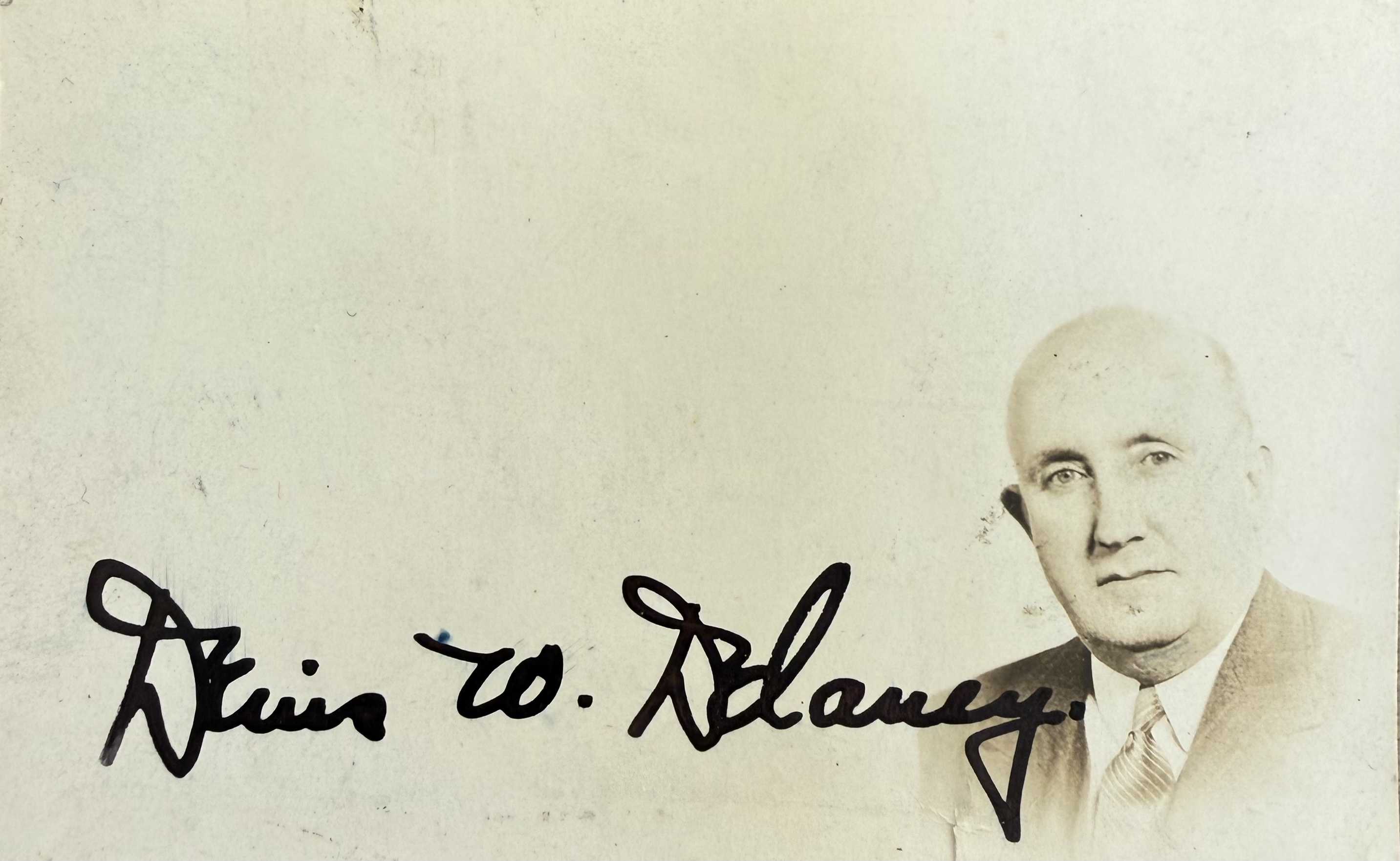
Denis W. Delaney
American government official, World War I veteran, entertainer, civic leader

=== Faculty ===
- Ruth Aguilera, business professor
- Michael Dukakis, politician
- Matthias Felleisen, author and computer scientist
- Floyd Flake, 18th president of Wilberforce University, politician, and pastor
- Mary Florentine, psychoacoustician
- Professor Lyrical, rapper, public speaker, and mathematician
- Pran Nath, physicist
- Nada Sanders, business professor
- Ena Vazquez-Nuttall, psychologist and dean of Bouve College of Health Sciences
- Susan Whitfield-Gabrieli, psychologist
- Chieh Wu, Mathematician

== See also ==
- Timeline of Boston
