= Susan Whitfield-Gabrieli =

American scientist

- Occupations: Psychologist/Neuroscientist, and Academic
- Spouse: John Gabrieli

Academic background
- Education: B.A., Biophysics/Physics; ABD., Mathematics; Ph.D., Psychology/Neuroscience
- Alma mater: University of California, Berkeley

Academic work
- Institutions: Northeastern University; Harvard Medical School

Susan Whitfield-Gabrieli is an American scientist, psychologist/neuroscientist, academic and researcher. She is a professor of psychology, the Founding Director of the Biomedical Imaging Center at Northeastern University, Researcher in the Department of Psychiatry at Massachusetts General Hospital, Harvard Medical School and a Research Affiliate of McGovern Institute for Brain Research at Massachusetts Institute of Technology.

Whitfield-Gabrieli's research is focused on the working of the human brain, its development from childhood through adult maturity, the brain's working in neurodevelopmental and neuropsychiatric disorders, and the translation of neuroscience knowledge into treatments. She is involved in the development of neuroimaging analysis methods and software packages including CONN, REX, and ART.

== Education ==
Whitfield-Gabrieli studied at University of California, Berkeley (UCB) and completed her bachelor's degree in Biophysics/Physics and her ABD (All But Dissertation) degree in Mathematics in 1988 and 1993, respectively. She received her second Doctoral degree in Psychology/Neuroscience from UCB in 2017.

== Career ==
Whitfield-Gabrieli started as a Research Associate and Teaching Assistant at UC Berkeley during the late 1980s and the early 1990s. She was then associated with EEG Systems Laboratory as a Research Associate from 1993 till 1996 and later as a Project Manager till 1998. She was appointed as a Science and Engineering Associate in the Department of Psychiatry and Psychology from 1998 to 2005. In 2005, she was appointed by McGovern Institute for Brain Research at MIT as a Research Scientist and was promoted to Principal Research Scientist in 2017. She then joined Northeastern University as a professor of Psychology and as Founding Director of the Northeastern University Biomedical Imaging Center (NUBIC) and joined the Department of Psychiatry at MGH, Harvard Medical School in 2022.

== Research ==
Whitfield-Gabrieli's research is focused on discovering brain-based biomarkers for improved diagnosis, early detection of mental disorders, prediction of therapeutic response and the development of novel therapeutic techniques to improve the available treatments. She uses neuroimaging techniques including electrophysiology (EEG), resting state functional magnetic resonance imaging (rs-fMRI), task-based fMRI (t-fMRI), real-time fMRI (rt-fMRI), and diffusion weighted imaging (DWI) to investigate the neural underpinnings of atypical development and the pathophysiology of psychiatric disorders. She also studied the neural systems underlying the suppression of memories.

Whitfield-Gabrieli's research regarding understanding the etiology of mental illness has revolved around investigations of resting state networks (RSN), called the default mode network (DMN), which is an identified neural system associated with the free wandering of the human mind. She provided evidence for the overlap between the neural systems underlying the two core medial hubs of the DMN and the self-reference network and showed that greater activation and connectivity of these brain regions are positively correlated with more psychopathology in patients suffering from psychiatric illness and in those at-risk for developing mental illness. Further, she showed that individual differences in negative DMN correlations (anticorrelations) with the frontoparietal control network (FPCN) are associated with individual differences in executive function and are significantly reduced in psychiatric populations with cognitive impairment. Furthermore, her group has also demonstrated a causal relation between DMN activity and attentional performance and more recently has demonstrated that DMN/FPCN anticorrelations significantly predict fluctuations in mind wandering.

Whitfield-Gabrieli has demonstrated that baseline RSNs predict future progression of psychopathology in young children years later, conversion to illness in individuals who are clinically and genetically at high-risk and predict treatment response to cognitive behavioral therapy in social anxiety disorder. She employs real-time fMRI neurofeedback to train individuals how to modulate their brain function and has coupled this intervention with mindfulness meditation to mitigate DMN hyperactivation/hyperconnectivity and the associated clinical symptoms in patients suffering from psychiatric illness.

=== Advancement of neuroimaging analysis methods and tools ===
Whitfield-Gabrieli has conducted research regarding the development of innovative neuroimaging analysis methods and software packages. She developed a toolbox called ART, which facilitated the detection and correction of artifacts in fMRI task activation and resting state functional connectivity data.

In 2009, she formed a collaboration with Alfonso Nieto Castanon to develop a toolbox for resting state and task based functional connectivity called CONN. They implemented an alternative method of noise reduction, called the anatomical CompCor approach, that did not rely on global signal regression in order to facilitate the interpretation of anticorrelations. Her research indicated that the aforementioned approach for noise reduction increased specificity and sensitivity and allowed for the interpretation of anti-correlations.

In the early 2000s Whitfield-Gabrieli's team developed real-time fMRI (rt-fMRI) neurofeedback at Stanford University and after moving to MIT (2005) her team further developed this system for Multivariate and Univariate Real-time Functional Imaging (MURFI). At Northeastern University, her team combined rt-fMRI neurofeedback with mindfulness meditation to create a transdiagnostic intervention to mitigate DMN connectivity and associated clinical symptoms and increase DMN anticorrelations for patients suffering from mental illness.

== Bibliography ==
- Anderson, Michael C.; Ochsner, Kevin N.; Kuhl, Brice; Cooper, Jeffrey; Robertson, Elaine; Gabrieli, Susan W.; Glover, Gary H.; Gabrieli, John D. E. (9 January 2004). "Neural Systems Underlying the Suppression of Unwanted Memories". Science. 303 (5655): 232–235. Bibcode:2004Sci...303..232A. doi:10.1126/science.1089504. PMID 14716015.
- Whitfield-Gabrieli, Susan; Thermenos, Heidi W.; Milanovic, Snezana; Tsuang, Ming T.; Faraone, Stephen V.; McCarley, Robert W.; Shenton, Martha E.; Green, Alan I.; Nieto-Castanon, Alfonso; LaViolette, Peter; Wojcik, Joanne; Gabrieli, John D. E.; Seidman, Larry J. (27 January 2009). "Hyperactivity and hyperconnectivity of the default network in schizophrenia and in first-degree relatives of persons with schizophrenia". Proceedings of the National Academy of Sciences. 106 (4): 1279–1284. Bibcode:2009PNAS..106.1279W. doi:10.1073/pnas.0809141106. PMC 2633557. PMID 19164577.
- Biswal, Bharat B.; Mennes, Maarten; Zuo, Xi-Nian; Gohel, Suril; Kelly, Clare; Smith, Steve M.; Beckmann, Christian F.; Adelstein, Jonathan S.; Buckner, Randy L.; Colcombe, Stan; Dogonowski, Anne-Marie; Ernst, Monique; Fair, Damien; Hampson, Michelle; Hoptman, Matthew J.; Hyde, James S.; Kiviniemi, Vesa J.; Kötter, Rolf; Li, Shi-Jiang; Lin, Ching-Po; Lowe, Mark J.; Mackay, Clare; Madden, David J.; Madsen, Kristoffer H.; Margulies, Daniel S.; Mayberg, Helen S.; McMahon, Katie; Monk, Christopher S.; Mostofsky, Stewart H.; Nagel, Bonnie J.; Pekar, James J.; Peltier, Scott J.; Petersen, Steven E.; Riedl, Valentin; Rombouts, Serge A. R. B.; Rypma, Bart; Schlaggar, Bradley L.; Schmidt, Sein; Seidler, Rachael D.; Siegle, Greg J.; Sorg, Christian; Teng, Gao-Jun; Veijola, Juha; Villringer, Arno; Walter, Martin; Wang, Lihong; Weng, Xu-Chu; Whitfield-Gabrieli, Susan; Williamson, Peter; Windischberger, Christian; Zang, Yu-Feng; Zhang, Hong-Ying; Castellanos, F. Xavier; Milham, Michael P. (9 March 2010). "Toward discovery science of human brain function". Proceedings of the National Academy of Sciences. 107 (10): 4734–4739. Bibcode:2010PNAS..107.4734B. doi:10.1073/pnas.0911855107. hdl:1721.1/61013. PMC 2842060. PMID 20176931.
- Whitfield-Gabrieli, Susan; Nieto-Castanon, Alfonso (June 2012). "Conn : A Functional Connectivity Toolbox for Correlated and Anticorrelated Brain Networks". Brain Connectivity. 2 (3): 125–141. doi:10.1089/brain.2012.0073. PMID 22642651.
- Whitfield-Gabrieli, Susan; Ford, Judith M. (27 April 2012). "Default Mode Network Activity and Connectivity in Psychopathology". Annual Review of Clinical Psychology. 8 (1): 49–76. doi:10.1146/annurev-clinpsy-032511-143049. PMID 22224834.
