= The Huntington News =

Student newspaper of Northeastern University, US

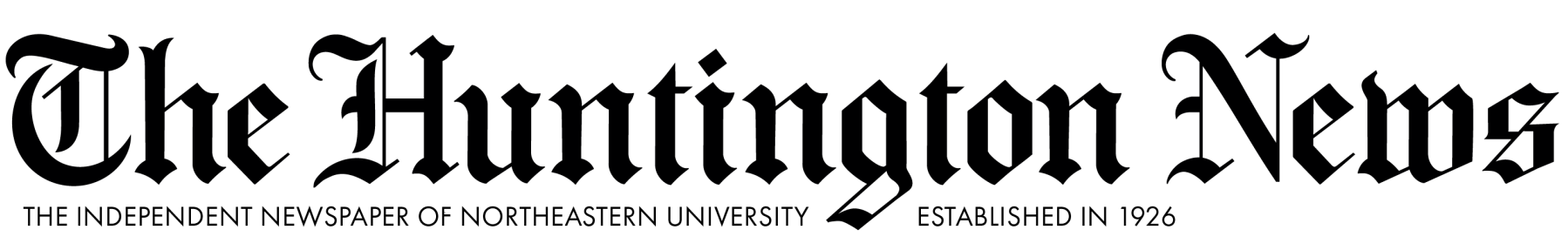
- Type: Student newspaper
- Format: Broadsheet
- School: Northeastern University
- Owner: World Series Way Publishing Company Inc.
- Editor-in-chief: Zoe MacDiarmid
- Managing editor: Katarina Schmeiszer; Gitana Savage
- Campus editor: Madison Evangelist
- Metro editor: Devyn Rudnick
- Opinion editor: Ava Vitiello
- Photo editor: Margot Murphy
- Founded: Formed 1926; Independent 2008
- Language: English
- Headquarters: Boston, Massachusetts
- Country: United States of America
- Website: www.huntnewsnu.com

The Huntington News is the independent student-run and operated newspaper of Northeastern University, a private research institution in Boston, Massachusetts.

The Huntington News is the most frequently published publication on Northeastern's campus and features campus, city, sports, lifestyle, opinion, data, project, photo, and audiovisual sections.

Over 100 students contribute to the publication, including via writing, photography, design, and marketing.

== History ==
Founded in 1926, The Northeastern News was Northeastern University's student newspaper. As a recognized student group, The Northeastern News reached a weekly circulation of 10,000. The newspaper had been fiscally self-sufficient for years and in 2008, it was announced that The Northeastern News would go independent and become a registered 501(c)(3) non-profit corporation, in the process changing their name to The Huntington News.

As of 2011, The Huntington News operates under World Series Way Publishing Company, Inc., a 501(c)3 nonprofit company.

In 2016, the newspaper announced a fundraising campaign to clear a $30,000 debt to Turley Publications, and to place the publication on a firmer financial footing. In 2019, the newspaper announced they had cleared their debt to Turley Publications, generated via donations, fundraising, and advertising revenue.

== Distribution ==
The Huntington News publishes articles daily online at https://huntnewsnu.com. In addition, they frequently update on social media platforms, including Instagram and X, under the username @huntnewsnu.

As of 2025, print editions are distributed roughly once a month during the fall and spring semesters.

== Operation ==
The Huntington News is directed by the Editorial Board and overseen by its Board of Directors. The business team includes the business manager, advertising manager, and development and outreach coordinator.

Copyediting follows Associated Press standards in addition to an in-house Style Guide.

The Huntington News follows Associated Press standards for information on the record, off the record, on background, and on deep background.
