= List of presidents of Northeastern University =

Northeastern University has had 7 presidents since it was founded in 1898.

== List of presidents ==
1. Frank Palmer Speare, 1898–1940 (founder)
2. Carl Stephens Ell, 1940–1959
3. Asa Smallidge Knowles, 1959–1975
4. Kenneth Gilmore Ryder, 1975–1989
5. John Anthony Curry, 1989–1996
6. Richard M. Freeland, 1996–2006
7. Joseph E. Aoun, 2006–present
