= List of IEEE awards =

Through its awards program, the Institute of Electrical and Electronics Engineers recognizes contributions that advance the fields of interest to the IEEE. For nearly a century, the IEEE Awards Program has paid tribute to technical professionals whose exceptional achievements and outstanding contributions have made a lasting impact on technology, society and the engineering profession. The IEEE Medals and IEEE Technical Field Awards are institution-level awards. They are considered more prestigious than IEEE Society level awards and are administered by IEEE Awards Board. Each year, the IEEE Board of Directors approved the winners of these prestigious medals and awards at their annual board meeting. An IEEE Honors Ceremony is organized and held in New York each year to present the medals and awards to the recipients.

Funds for the awards program, other than those provided by corporate sponsors for some awards, are administered by the IEEE Foundation.

== IEEE Medals ==
- IEEE top medal and highest honor
  - IEEE Medal of Honor
- Medals not specific to a technology field
  - IEEE Edison Medal (IEEE's principal medal for a meritorious career)
  - IEEE Founders Medal (for leadership, planning, and administration)
  - IEEE Mildred Dresselhaus Medal (for carbon-based materials research)
  - IEEE James H. Mulligan, Jr. Education Medal
- Medals in specific technology areas
  - IEEE Frances E. Allen Medal (for computing)
  - IEEE Alexander Graham Bell Medal (for telecommunications engineering)
  - IEEE Medal for Environmental and Safety Technologies
  - IEEE Richard W. Hamming Medal (for information theory and coding)
  - IEEE Medal for Innovations in Healthcare Technology
  - IEEE Nick Holonyak, Jr. Medal for Semiconductor Optoelectronic Technologies
  - IEEE Jagadish Chandra Bose Medal in Wireless Communications
  - IEEE Jack S. Kilby Signal Processing Medal (for signal processing)
  - IEEE/RSE James Clerk Maxwell Medal (for electronics and telecommunications)
  - IEEE Jun-ichi Nishizawa Medal (for materials and device sciences)
  - IEEE Robert N. Noyce Medal (for microelectronics)
  - IEEE Dennis J. Picard Medal for Radar Technologies and Applications
  - IEEE Medal in Power Engineering
  - IEEE Simon Ramo Medal (for systems engineering)
  - IEEE John von Neumann Medal (for computer-related technology)
- Discontinued medal programs
  - IEEE Heinrich Hertz Medal (last awarded in 2001)
  - IEEE Lamme Medal (last awarded in 2002)
  - IEEE Medal for Engineering Excellence (last awarded in 2004)

== IEEE Technical field awards ==
- Current technical field awards
  - IEEE Arun N. Netravali Video Analytics, Technology, and Systems Award
  - IEEE Biomedical Engineering Award
  - IEEE Cledo Brunetti Award (for nanotechnology and miniaturization)
  - IEEE Roger W. Brockett Control Systems Award
  - IEEE Electromagnetics Award
  - IEEE Rao R. Tummala Electronics Packaging Award
  - IEEE Fourier Award for Signal Processing
  - IEEE James L. Flanagan Speech and Audio Processing Award
  - IEEE Andrew S. Grove Award (for solid-state devices)
  - IEEE Herman Halperin Electric Transmission and Distribution Award
  - IEEE Masaru Ibuka Consumer Electronics Award
  - IEEE Innovation in Societal Infrastructure Award
  - IEEE Internet Award
  - IEEE Richard Harold Kaufmann Award (for industrial systems engineering)
  - IEEE Joseph F. Keithley Award in Instrumentation and Measurement
  - IEEE Gustav Robert Kirchhoff Award (for electronic circuits and systems)
  - IEEE Leon K. Kirchmayer Graduate Teaching Award
  - IEEE Computer Science and Engineering Undergraduate Teaching Award
  - IEEE Koji Kobayashi Computers and Communications Award
  - IEEE William E. Newell Power Electronics Award
  - IEEE Daniel E. Noble Award (for emerging technologies)
  - IEEE Donald O. Pederson Award in Solid-State Circuits
  - IEEE Frederik Philips Award (for management of research and development)
  - IEEE Photonics Award
  - IEEE Robotics and Automation Award
  - IEEE Frank Rosenblatt Award (for biologically and linguistically motivated computational paradigms such as neural networks)
  - IEEE Charles Proteus Steinmetz Award (for standardization)
  - IEEE Marie Sklodowska-Curie Award (for nuclear and plasma engineering)
  - IEEE Eric E. Sumner Award (for communications technology)
  - IEEE Undergraduate Teaching Award
  - IEEE Nikola Tesla Award (for power technology)
  - IEEE Kiyo Tomiyasu Award (for technologies holding the promise of innovative applications)
  - IEEE Transportation Technologies Award
- Discontinued technical field awards
  - IEEE David Sarnoff Award (for electronics, last awarded in 2016)
  - IEEE Emanuel R. Piore Award (for information processing systems in computer science, last awarded in 2012)
  - IEEE Judith A. Resnik Award (for space engineering, last awarded in 2012)
  - IEEE Reynold B. Johnson Data Storage Device Technology Award (last awarded in 2010)
  - IEEE Reynold B. Johnson Information Storage Systems Award (last awarded in 2015)

== IEEE-level paper prizes ==
- IEEE Donald G. Fink Prize Paper Award
- IEEE W.R.G. Baker Award

== Other IEEE-level recognitions ==
- IEEE Haraden Pratt Award (for service to IEEE)
- IEEE Richard M. Emberson Award (for service to IEEE)
- IEEE Corporate Innovation Recognition
- IEEE Ernst Weber Engineering Leadership Recognition (also known as IEEE Ernst Weber Managerial Leadership Award, last awarded in 2016)
- IEEE Honorary Membership
- Hendrik W. Bode Lecture Prize

== Scholarships ==
- IEEE Life Members Graduate Study Fellowship in Electrical Engineering was established by the IEEE in 2000. The fellowship is awarded annually to a first year, full-time graduate student obtaining their masters for work in the area of electrical engineering, at an engineering school/program of recognized standing worldwide.
- IEEE Charles LeGeyt Fortescue Graduate Scholarship was established by the IRE in 1939 to commemorate Charles Legeyt Fortescue's contributions to electrical engineering. The scholarship is awarded for one year of full-time graduate work obtaining their masters in electrical engineering an ANE engineering school of recognized standing in the United States.

== Awards at the society and technical council level ==
The IEEE societies (of which there are 39 as of June 2020) and IEEE technical councils (seven as of June 2020) also have their own award programs. These include recognizing volunteers at the society technical committee levels and conference levels, for service and for technical work. However, IEEE institution level awards are above IEEE societies and technical council level awards, with higher standards, recognition, and prestige.

== Student activities ==
IEEE offers many student awards, competitions and other opportunities for students to become actively involved.

- IEEEXtreme Programming Competition
- IEEEmadC
