= Michael Nosonovsky =

Russian-American mechanical engineer

- Михаи́л Ио́сифович Носоно́вский
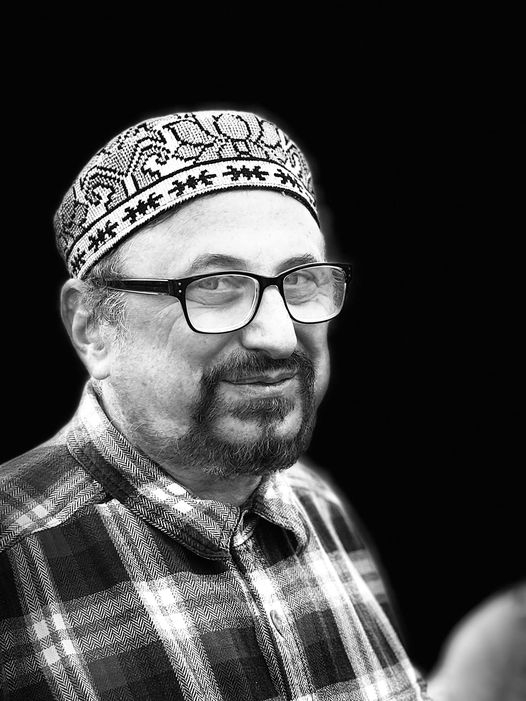
- Born: 1969 (age 56–57); St. Petersburg (Leningrad), Soviet Union
- Known for: multiscale Tribology, modeling of Droplet cluster, Triboinformatics, Green Tribology
- Awards: 2008 ASME Burt L. Newkirk Award
- Scientific career
- Fields: Mechanical engineering, Tribology, Physical Chemistry
- Workplaces: University of Wisconsin–Milwaukee
- Doctoral advisor: George Adams

Michael Nosonovsky (born 1969) is a professor of mechanical engineering at the University of Wisconsin–Milwaukee known for his contribution to Tribology, Surface science, and Hebrew Epigraphy.

== Education and career ==
Nosonovsky graduated from St. Petersburg Polytechnic University with a MSc degree in Mechanics / Mechanical Engineering in 1992. In 1989-1993 he was a student of St. Petersburg Jewish University, of which he became the first alumnus and where he worked as a teacher of Hebrew from 1992 till 1997. In 2001, he got PhD degree in Mechanical Engineering from Northeastern University in Boston, advisor George Adams. He was a postdoctoral scholar at Ohio State University (2002-2005, advisor Bharat Bhushan), National Institute of Standards and Technology (2005-2007), and Stevens Institute of Technology (2007-2009).

Since 2009, he has been a professor of Mechanical Engineering at the University of Wisconsin–Milwaukee. Since 2016, he is a Fellow of the American Society of Mechanical Engineers. Nosonovsky was a visiting professor or fellow at the Hebrew University (2016), the Technion (2017), University of Tyumen (2017-2023), ITMO University (2021-2025), Ariel University (2024) and Weizmann Institute of Science (2024).

== Research ==
Nosonovsky's research interests include Tribology, Contact mechanics, surface science and engineering, and interfacial phenomena such as droplets and bubbles. He predicted theoretically Adams-Martins instabilities during the contact of rough periodic elastic surfaces and extended the studies of mechanical frictional instabilities to a broad class of interfacial chemical and physical phenomena.

At Ohio State University, he studied the scale effect on friction, which is used in various areas, including the magnetic disk industry. After that, Nosonovsky investigated the role of multi-scale and hierarchical structures on solid surfaces and demonstrated that such structures enhance the stability of superhydrophobic biomimetic Lotus effect surfaces, which, according to New Scientist, was a "game changing result" that could be utilized in the design of non-sticky materials. He also proposed a new classification of superhydrophobic surfaces based on the multiscale roughness with account to the "rose petal effect". Nosonovsky suggested a procedure to derive the Amontons-Coulomb law of dry friction from the Second law of thermodynamics using Non-equilibrium thermodynamics and a limiting transition from a 3D (bulk) to a 2D (surface) material description. With colleagues in NIST, he studied water under tension (negative pressure) in microscopic capillary bridges using the Atomic force microscopy and reported negative pressure (tensile stress) reaching −160 MPa, establishing a world record; however, some scholars questioned the assumptions of that study.

Among other results obtained during his tenure at the University of Wisconsin–Milwaukee are the observation of wetting transitions in underwater oleophobic metallic surfaces, an explanation of why hydrophobic materials do not always repel ice, the application of Non-equilibrium thermodynamics to the study of Self-healing material, supehydrophobic concrete and antimicrobial coatings, and the application of the separation of motions method, which is used in mechanics for the studies of Kapitza's pendulum, to the problems of surface physics and chemistry.

In 2010, Nosonovsky, together with Bharat Bhushan suggested 12 principles of a new scientific discipline, Green Tribology (or Ecotribology), which are now widely used by researchers in various parts of the world. Nosonovsky was also a pioneer of another new scientific discipline, Triboinformatics.

Among other topics, Nosonovsky's research projects included investigations of mechanisms of wringing in Johansson Gauge blocks, investigating the lowest possible surface energy of a solid, and understanding the role of friction in the invention of the pendulum clock. Since 2017, Nosonovsky studied various aspects of the levitating Droplet cluster including the applicability of Dynkin diagram and ADE classification to the diversity of small clusters.

During his tenure as ITMO Fellow in the Infochemistry Scientific Center at ITMO University, Nosonovsky investigated new methods of surface roughness analysis, such as Topological data analysis, and applications of Triboinformatics to various areas ranging from taste studies to protein folding, to applications of Ergodicity to cancer treatment.

Besides his work in mechanical engineering, materials science, and chemistry, Nosonovsky has several important academic publications in the field of history including History of science, and Hebrew Epigraphy. This includes the catalog of 16th-century Jewish gravestones in Ukraine with the oldest gravestones from the region, the identification and publication of the first Hebrew book in Central Asia, identification and publication of a 17th century Karaite poem from Derazhne, finding the oldest gravestone with a Hebrew inscription in Belarus, the identification of the gravestone of Josiah Pardo, the first Rabbi in Central / North America in Kingston, Jamaica, the identification of the oldest synagogue in Morocco, and establishing the role of Abner of Burgos in the development of the Copernicus astronomic system. Nosonovsky also has academic publications on the Afro-Cuban religion of Santería / Ifá.

== Honors and achievements ==
Nosonovsky has coauthored and edited nine books, including the first monograph on biomimetic self-healing materials, a monograph on Droplet cluster and more than 200 peer-reviewed research articles. He is a recipient of the ASME Burt L. Newkirk Award "for outstanding research in nanotribology, adhesion, and tribology of functional bioinspired surfaces, including the scale effect on friction and patterned nonadhesive surfaces using the Lotus effect." He was also a recipient of the UWM Foundation Research Award.
