= Northeastern University School of Pharmacy =

Coordinates: 42°20′12.64″N 71°5′30.21″W

Northeastern University School of Pharmacy and Pharmaceutical Sciences
- Type: Private
- Established: 1962
- Parent institution: Northeastern University
- Dean: Chrissa Kioussi, PhD
- Students: 761
- Location: Boston, Massachusetts, United States
- Campus: Urban
- Website: https://bouve.northeastern.edu/academics/school-of-pharmacy-and-pharmaceutical-sciences/

Northeastern University School of Pharmacy and Pharmaceutical Sciences is the pharmacy school at Northeastern University in Boston, Massachusetts. It is one of four schools that comprise the Bouvé College of Health Sciences. Northeastern's Doctor of Pharmacy (PharmD) program is the only PharmD cooperative education, or co-op, program in the United States. Students who participate in the co-op program are placed in paid, full-time positions that provide profession experience.

== History ==
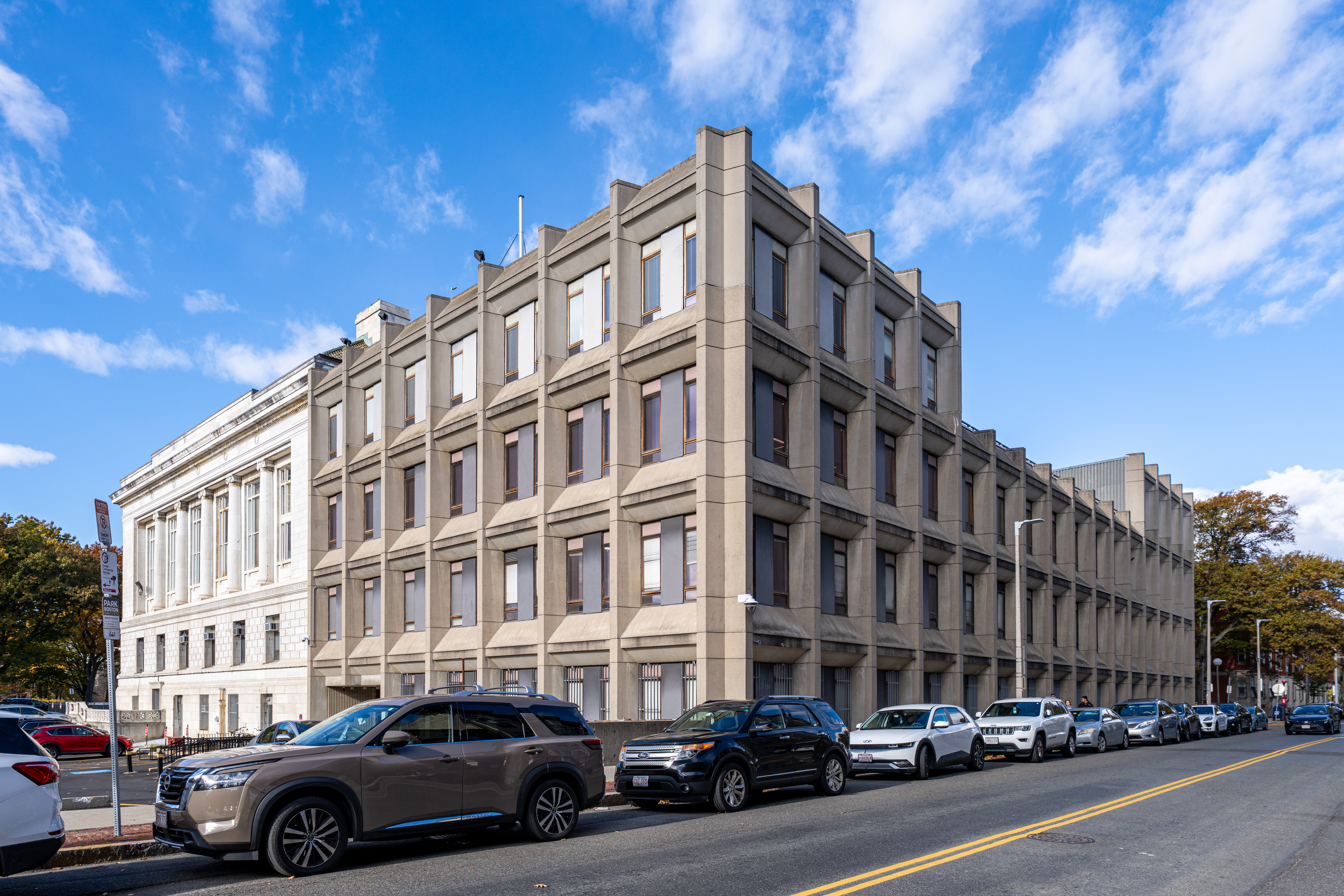
140 The Fenway (2025)

The Northeastern University School of Pharmacy and Pharmaceutical Sciences traces its origins to 1927, when the Meriano School of Pharmacy on Huntington Avenue at Massachusetts Avenue was founded by Greek-born pharmacist Constantine Meriano. The institution was officially incorporated in 1940 as the Boston School of Pharmacy. In 1941, the school's Board of Trustees initiated a four-year curriculum and in 1943 the Massachusetts Legislature authorized the trustees to grant the degree of Bachelor of Science in Pharmacy. The name of the school was changed to the New England College of Pharmacy in 1949. In 1962, the New England College of Pharmacy merged with Northeastern University to become the Northeastern University College of Pharmacy. LeRoy C. Keagle, president of the New England College of Pharmacy, was appointed the school's the first dean and 205 students enrolled in the new endeavor. Four years later, the college expanded it graduate degree programs. In 1971, the college became known as the College of Pharmacy and Allied Health Professions, modeled after a similar institution at Temple University in Philadelphia. The change represented a compromise between Northeastern President Asa Knowles, who wanted a separate health sciences college, and some faculty members who did not want to cede authority over their individual programs.

Another merger occurred in 1992, when the Boston Bouvé College of Human Development Professions merged with the College of Pharmacy and Allied Health Professions to form the Bouvé College of Pharmacy and Health Sciences. In 1999, the Bouvé College of Health Sciences was formed to become the home of Northeastern's School of Pharmacy, School of Nursing and School of Health Professions.

== Deans of Northeastern School of Pharmacy ==
- LeRoy C. Keagle, 1962-1975
- Albert H. Soloway, 1975-1978
- Gerald E. Schumacher, 1978-1988
- James J. Gozzo, 1988-1998
- Judith Barr (interim), 1999-2001
- Daniel C. Robinson, 2001-2006
- John R. Reynolds, 2006-2020
- Miriam Mobley Smith (interim), 2020–2021
- Tatiana K. Bronich, 2021–2025
- Michael J. Gonyeau (interim), 2025 - 2026
- Chrissa Kioussi, 2026 - Present

== Academics ==
Degrees offered include a Doctor of Pharmacy (Pharm.D); Doctoral (PhD) programs in Pharmaceutical Sciences, Medical Chemistry, Pharmacology and Biomedical Sciences; Master's (MS) programs in Pharmaceutical Sciences, Medical Chemistry, Pharmacology and Biomedical Sciences; and a Bachelor's (BS) program in Pharmaceutical Sciences. Postgraduate opportunities, including residency and fellowship programs, are also offered.

Students who participate in the co-op program supplement semesters of study with work in full-time positions that include community pharmacies, hospitals, clinics, private companies and government agencies.

The school is accredited by the Accreditation Council for Pharmacy Education (ACPE).

== Campus ==
The School of Pharmacy and Pharmaceutical Scinces is located in Boston's Fenway–Kenmore neighborhood. In 2002, it began using the newly built $37 million Behrakis Health Science Center, named after 1957 pharmacy school alumnus George D. Behrakis, which contains laboratories, classrooms, lecture halls, an amphitheater and simulation centers. In 2012, the School of Pharmacy and Pharmaceutical Scinces moved its administrative offices into a renovated facility called 140 The Fenway, which has a historic exterior dating back to the 18th century. The 101,000 square feet (9,400 m^{2}) building contains laboratory space for different departments and is located next to the Museum of Fine Arts, Boston, which owns the building

The pharmacy school is also located near the Longwood Medical Area, an area of Boston that includes the Harvard Medical School, Harvard T.H. Chan School of Public Health, Harvard School of Dental Medicine, Brigham and Women's Hospital, Beth Israel Deaconess Medical Center, Boston Children's Hospital, Dana–Farber Cancer Institute and Joslin Diabetes Center.
