= ASME Burt L. Newkirk Award =

The Burt L. Newkirk Award is an ASME-level award presented to "individuals under the age of 40 who have made a notable contribution to the field of tribology in research or development as evidenced by important tribology publications". The award is called after Burt L. Newkirk, who was an expert in the field of tribology.

== List of recipients ==
Source: ASME

- 1976 Francis E. Kennedy, Jr.
- 1977 Steve M. Rohde
- 1978 Pradeep Gupta
- 1979 Thomas A. Dow
- 1980 Stuart H. Lowenthal
- 1982 Dennis F. Li
- 1983 Bharat Bhushan
- 1984 Hooshang Heshmat
- 1986 Itzhak Green
- 1987 Pawan K. Goenka
- 1988 Kyriakos Komvopoulos
- 1990 Michael M. Khonsari
- 1991 Farshid Sadehi
- 1992 Thomas N. Farris
- 1994 Srinivasan Chandrasekar
- 1996 Christopher DellaCorte
- 1997 Chiao-Ping Ku
- 1998 Timothy C. Ovaert
- 1999 Rohit S. Paranjpe
- 2000 Steven R. Schmid
- 2001 Andreas A. Polycarpou
- 2002 Thierry A. Blanchet
- 2003 Sergio E. Diaz
- 2004 W. Gregory Sawyer
- 2005 Michael Lovell
- 2006 Mitjan Kalin
- 2007 Lior Kogut
- 2008 Michael Nosonovsky
- 2009 Robert Carpick
- 2010 C. Fred Higgs III
- 2011 Robert L. Jackson
- 2012 Ashlie Martini
- 2013 Tae Ho Kim
- 2014 Bart Raeymaekers
- 2015 David Burris
- 2016 Aaron Greco
- 2019 Alison C. Dunn
- 2020 Sung-Hwa Jeung
- 2022 Filippo Mangolini
- 2023 Melih Eriten
- 2024 Brandon Krick

== See also ==
- List of mechanical engineering awards
