= Northeastern University Bouvé College of Health Sciences =

Private health college in Boston, Massachusetts, US

Coordinates: 42.337°N 71.091°W

Bouvé College of Health Sciences
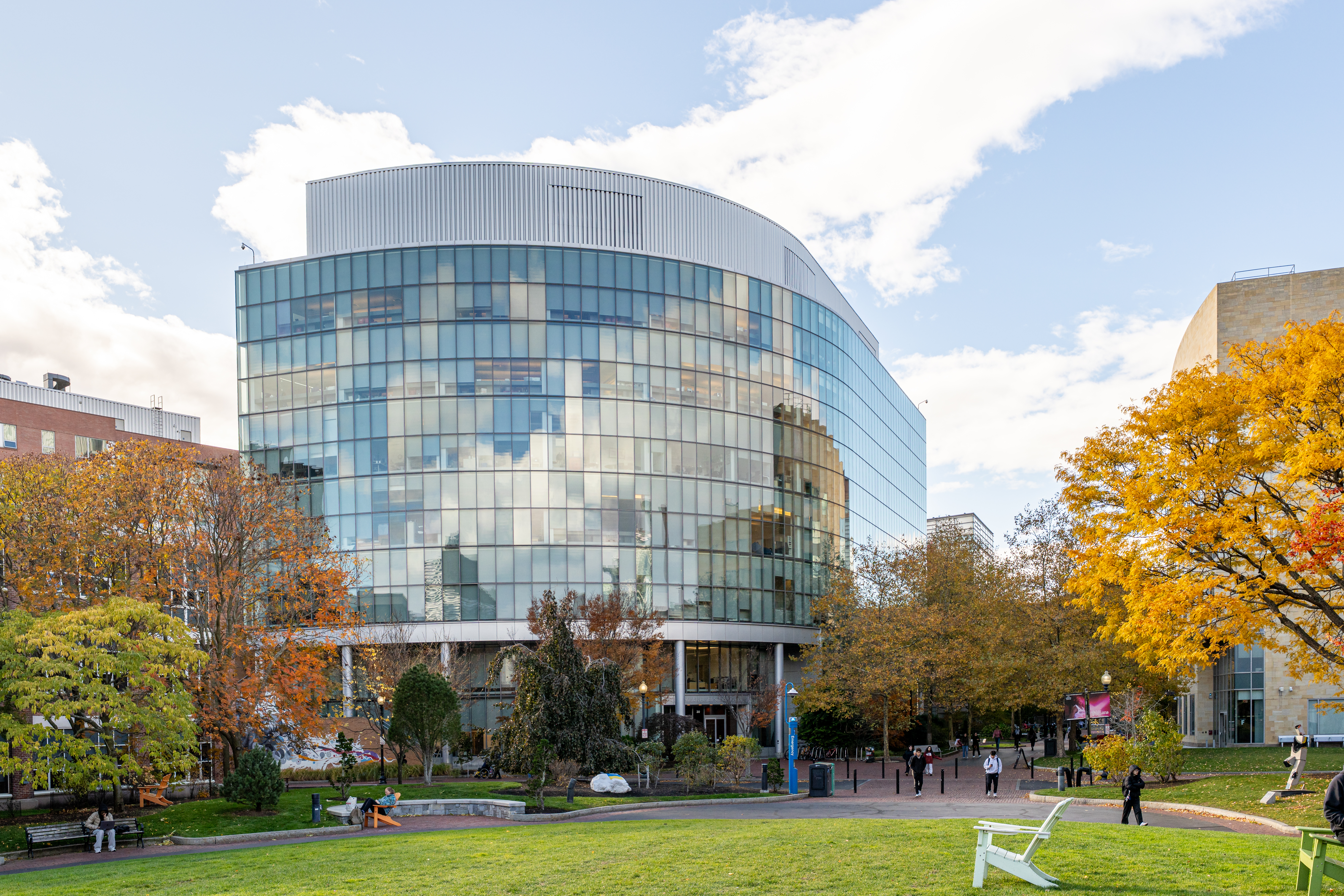
- Type: Private
- Established: 1925
- Parent institution: Northeastern University
- Director: Carmen C. Sceppa, M.D., Ph.D.
- Faculty: 1,000
- Students: 5,000 students
- Location: Boston, Massachusetts, United States
- Campus: Urban
- Website: bouve.northeastern.edu

The Bouvé College of Health Sciences is the allied health education college of Northeastern University in Boston, Massachusetts. It encompasses four schools: School of Community Health and Behavioral Sciences, School of Nursing, School of Clinical and Rehabilitation Sciences, and School of Pharmacy and Pharmaceutical Sciences. The college offers more than 80 undergraduate and graduate programs, including its online-based accelerated nursing program. In addition to Boston, Bouvé College of Health Science programs are offered at satellite locations in Burlington, Massachusetts and Charlotte, North Carolina and online.

Tracing its roots back to 1925, the Bouvé College of Health Sciences more recently was formed after the Boston-Bouvé College of Human Development Professions and College of Pharmacy and Allied Health Professions merged in the fall of 1992. At. It has approximately 5,000 students, 1,000 faculty and staff, and 40,000 alumni worldwide.

== History ==
Bouvé College's immediate roots go back to 1964, when Bouvé-Boston, a well-known four-year women's college dedicated to physical education and physical therapy, cut its ties with Tufts University to join Northeastern, changing its name to "Boston-Bouve". In 1980, with Northeastern's College of Education suffering from declining enrollments, the two colleges merged. Through the 1980s, with industry changes, Boston-Bouve's emphases began to shift as well—from turning out physical education teachers to producing athletic trainers; from community and outdoor recreation programs to fitness and sports management; and to a greater focus on preparing students for careers in rehabilitation centers, fitness and exercise centers, and hospitals.

Around the same time, in 1971, Northeastern consolidated its fast-growing health science programs, including the College of Pharmacy, into a new College of Pharmacy and Allied Health Professions. By 1987, a commission of faculty and administrators had recommended creating one health professions college composed of four schools: pharmacy, nursing, allied health education, and administration and counseling. However, faculty voiced concerns about the difficulty of bringing disparate schools together in such a merger.

In 1990, an academic priorities committee was formed under Northeastern President John Curry's tenure to examine where the university should downsize its academic operations. Those recommendations led Northeastern's Faculty Senate and Board of Trustees to approve the merger of the Boston-Bouvé College of Human Development Professions and College of Pharmacy and Allied Health Professions. James J. Gozzo, interim dean of the College of Pharmacy and Allied Health Professions, was appointed the first dean of the newly formed Bouvé College of Pharmacy and Health Sciences in 1992. In the process, three Bouvé programs: physical education, school and community health education, and recreation management, were eliminated after the merger. A fourth program, the graduate program in speech-language pathology and audiology, was proposed to be eliminated but was spared. The merger and program eliminations reportedly saved the university about $1.5 million over a four-year period. Bouvé's strongest programs, pharmacy and physical therapy, were complemented by six other signature programs: athletic training; cardiopulmonary sciences; counseling psychology, rehabilitation, and special education; medical laboratory science; speech-language pathology and audiology; and the physician assistant program.

In the area of research, the level of outside support increased to about $4 million annually. A new research center, the Center for Drug Targeting and Analysis, was founded under the direction of Ban-an Khaw, an internationally known researcher who came from Harvard Medical School and Massachusetts General Hospital in 1991. Khaw's work was supported by pharmacy school alumnus George D. Behrakis, class of 1957, who gave $250,000 for Khaw's endowed professorship, and two years later contributed $1 million for an endowed chair. Behrakis also donated money for the construction of the $37 million Behrakis Health Science Center in 2002. The state-of-the-art facility includes two three-story atriums and a glass enclosed granite staircase. It also contains two lecture halls, an amphitheater, classrooms, laboratories and simulation centers. Attached to the facility is an underground parking garage.

=== Boston School of Physical Education ===
Bouvé as an institution originally began in 1925 as a separate school, the Boston School of Physical Therapy and Physical Education, with a curriculum centered around physical education. Its founder, Marjorie Bouvé, a Massachusetts native and graduate of Boston University, created the school after resigning from her post at the Boston School of Physical Education. While the school succeeded in increasing enrollment in its beginning years, it was hamstrung by its lack of accreditation to grant four-year degrees. Marjorie Bouvé petitioned the Massachusetts Board of Education in 1929 to authorize the school as a degree-granting institution but was unsuccessful in her efforts.

When the Boston School of Physical Education first opened its doors, the school only granted a diploma in physical education. With students returning from service as reconstruction aides in World War II, physiotherapy courses quickly became an optional component of many school curriculums, including at Boston School of Physical Education. Although physiotherapy did not become a separate course of study until the 1950s, students increasingly enrolled at Bouvé-Boston because of its reputation as a leader in the movement to professionalize the discipline. In the 1960s, Bouvé-Boston implemented another new major in recreation education, which trained students to guide people of all ages through relaxing and creative leisure-time activities. Throughout all periods of curricular expansion over time, Bouvé has continued to maintain high enrollment standards.

Due to decreased enrollment and reduced tuition revenues during the years of the Great Depression, the Boston School of Physical Education proposed a merging of the two schools. Marjorie Bouvé accepted the proposal and also chose to affiliate the renamed Bouvé-Boston School of Physical Education with Simmons College. The agreement allowed the newly formed school to provide three-year degrees focusing on physical therapy or physical education, or a four-year Bachelor of Science (BS) degree through Simmons College. This relationship with Simmons College continued until 1949. Marjorie Bouvé also formed another agreement with Tufts College in 1942 which allowed graduates from Bouvé-Boston to pursue further education at Tufts through its Division of University Extension. At this point, Ruth Page Sweet, a Boston University graduate, had taken on the role of director for Bouvé-Boston.

Another shift occurred around a decade later. Tufts President Nils Y. Wessell believed students of the affiliates in the Bouvé-Boston School should be required to meet the bachelor's degree requirements met by students enrolled in other colleges within the university. These changes ran against Bouvé-Boston's focus on professional training throughout the students' four years of schooling, and Tufts was unwilling to accept alternate proposals offered by Bouvé-Boston administrators. Ultimately Bouvé-Boston School leaders were unable to resolve their differences and chose to disaffiliate. In 1965, Bouvé-Boston School joined Northeastern University as an on-campus college.

== Schools ==
The Bouvé College of Health Sciences is composed of four schools:

- School of Community Health and Behavioral Sciences
- School of Clinical and Rehabilitation Sciences
- School of Nursing
- School of Pharmacy and Pharmaceutical Sciences

== Academics ==
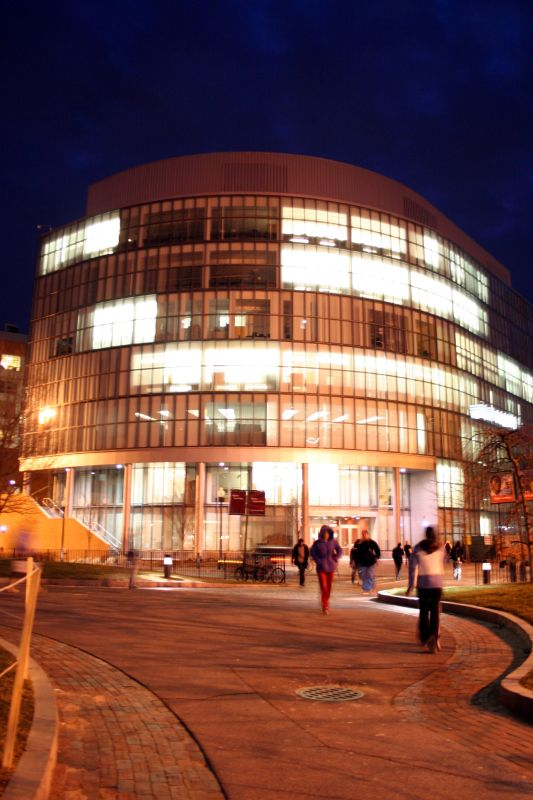
The Behrakis Health Sciences Center in 2006.

Bouvé College offers students the opportunity to study a broad array of both graduate and undergraduate programs in health, public health and the health profession fields including audiology; applied psychology; exercise science; health sciences; nursing, physician assistants; physical therapy, movement and rehabilitation sciences; and speech-language pathology.

=== Curriculum ===
The Bouvé College of Health Sciences contains four schools: Health Professions, Nursing, Clinical and Rehabilitation Sciences, and Pharmacy and Pharmaceutical Sciences. Its mission statement as a College of Health Sciences is to represent the center of excellence in health professional education, research, and service, and emphasizes the interdisciplinary nature of today's team approach to healthcare. The structure of the college is designed to foster cross-disciplinary interaction among faculty and students, encourages innovation in the education of both entry level and advanced practice health professionals, and recognizes the autonomy of each profession.

The college has an accelerated Bachelor/Graduate Degree Program, which includes a PlusOne Bachelor's/Master's degree program. This allows students to accelerate the process of completing their master's degree by implementing graduate credit courses, which contribute to both the undergraduate and graduate degree. The accelerated program includes the following programs: Bachelor of Science (BS) in Health Science & Master of Public Health Science (MPH), Doctor of Pharmacy (PharmD) & MPH, and BS in Psychology & Master of Science (MS) in Applied Behavior Analysis. In addition, a PreMed and PreHealth Advising program offers expertise to students interested in pursuing a career in medicine. The college reports a medical school acceptance rate of 79.41 percent among graduates.

Northeastern's signature cooperative education, or co-op, program allows students to alternate semesters of study with work experience. Bouvé College’s co-op program offers students two to three paid professional experiences at more than 175 employers in Boston, home to multiple world-renowned hospitals and biotech and healthcare companies, and around the world.

== Research ==
Bouvé College has a variety of research opportunities to give students a chance to actively participate in the field, labs, and clinical settings starting from as early as their first year. The college has nine research labs, including a robot and gait assisted rehab lab, neuro-physical therapy lab, and cancer survivor-ship center. Bouvé research ranges from studies at the cellular level to the global systems that impact health across communities. The Arnold S. Goldstein Simulation Laboratory is intended for students to apply immersive, hands-on experiential training across all disciplines. Using video capture technology, simulation bays, debriefing rooms, and high-tech patient simulators, students translate theoretical concepts to real skills, working with ‘patients’ or actors.

== Ranking ==
The Bouvé College of Health Sciences, based on U.S. News & World Report's college rankings from 2018 to 2019, was ranked #20 in Best Physician Assistant Programs, #33 in Best Pharmacy Schools, #40 in Best Physical Therapy Schools and #50 in Best Nursing Schools within the Graduate Level Schools.
