= Michael M. Khonsari =

Michael Khonsari is Dow Chemical Endowed Chair, and Professor and Director of the Center for Rotating Machinery (CeRoM) at the Department of Mechanical Engineering, Louisiana State University, Fellow of the ASME.

Khonsari received his BS, MS and PhD degrees in Mechanical Engineering from the University of Texas at Austin. His research is in the field of Tribology and, in particular, application of thermodynamic methods in Tribology. Khonsari has received the ASME Burt L. Newkirk Award, STLE Presidential Award, Alcoa Foundation Award, and William Kepler Whiteford Faculty Fellow award from the University of Pittsburgh. In 2014, he received the Mayo D. Hersey Award from the ASME. He is the author of several books. Among his known students is Michael Lovell, the current Chancellor of University of Wisconsin-Milwaukee.

Until 2022, he was Editor-in-Chief of the Journal of Tribology published by the American Society of Mechanical Engineers.
