= Ashlie Martini =

Tribologist

Ashlie Martini is a tribologist and professor of mechanical engineering at University of California, Merced.

== Biography ==
=== Education ===
Martini received her Bachelor of Science in mechanical engineering in 1998 from Northwestern University, in Evanston, Illinois. She later completed her Doctor of Philosophy in the same field, at the same school, in 2007.

=== Career ===
She was an assistant professor at Purdue University in West Lafayette, Indiana before becoming a full professor at University of California, Merced.

=== Research ===
The topics of study at "Martini Research Group: Fundamental Tribology Lab" at UC Merced include:

- Solid and liquid lubricants
- Tribochemistry
- Nanoscale contact and sliding

Martini's lab helps test dry lubricants for the Mars rover. "The Martini research group is performing some very critical and important data gathering for us and presenting that data in a way that helps us make critical, mission-sensitive decisions for Mars," said Duval Johnson of NASA's Jet Propulsion Laboratory.

== Awards and honors ==
- American Society of Mechanical Engineers - ASME Burt L. Newkirk Award (2012)
- Air Force Office of Scientific Research - AFOSR Young Investigator Award

== Distinctions ==
- Tribology Letters - Editor
- Tribology Transactions - Associate Editor
- Tribology International - Editorial Board Member
- Computational Materials Science - Editorial Board Member
- Lubricants - Editorial Board Member
- Gordon Research Conference on Tribology (International Conference) - Chair
- Society of Tribologists and Lubrication Engineers Tribology Frontiers Conference (International Conference) - Chair

== Publications ==
Martini has over 250 publications. Her most cited work has been cited over 4400 times:

- Moon, Robert J.; Martini, Ashlie; Nairn, John; Simonsen, John; Youngblood, Jeff (20 June 2011). "Cellulose nanomaterials review: Structure, properties and nanocomposites". Chemical Society Reviews. 40 (7): 3941–3994. doi:10.1039/C0CS00108B. PMID 21566801.

Her second most cited work has been cited over 400 times:

- Song, Jianwei; Chen, Chaoji; Zhu, Shuze; Zhu, Mingwei; Dai, Jiaqi; Ray, Upamanyu; Li, Yiju; Kuang, Yudi; Li, Yongfeng; Quispe, Nelson; Yao, Yonggang; Gong, Amy; Leiste, Ulrich H.; Bruck, Hugh A.; Zhu, J. Y.; Vellore, Azhar; Li, Heng; Minus, Marilyn L.; Jia, Zheng; Martini, Ashlie; Li, Teng; Hu, Liangbing (2018). "Processing bulk natural wood into a high-performance structural material". Nature. 554 (7691): 224–228. Bibcode:2018Natur.554..224S. doi:10.1038/nature25476. PMID 29420466. S2CID 4469909.

== See also ==
- Tribology
- Mechanical engineering
- ASME Burt L. Newkirk Award
- Stick-slip phenomenon
