= Hispanic College Fund =

Hispanic College Fund, Inc. (HCF) is a nonprofit organization aiming to prepare Hispanic young people to become professionals in the future. It serves primarily high school and college students. It was founded in 1993 by a group of Hispanic business leaders and is based in Washington, D.C. The current CEO is Carlos E. Santiago who replaced Joe Petrone in August 2010.

== Funding and collaboration ==
HCF is currently funded through personal and corporate contributions from companies in America including Estée Lauder Companies, The Ford Motor Company Fund, General Dynamics, Marriott International, Lockheed Martin, Verizon and Sodexo. It has collaborated with Google to offer $10,000 scholarships to eligible students to visit Google headquarters.

== See also ==
- United Negro College Fund
