= Mohawk Innovative Technology =

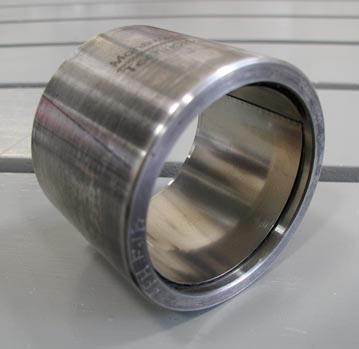
Mohawk 's foil-air bearing for the core rotor shaft of an aircraft turbine engine.

Mohawk Innovative Technology, Inc. is an American product and research and development technology company that develops oil-free foil bearings, magnetic bearings and non-contacting foil seals for high-speed rotating machinery, such as gas turbine engines, turbochargers, compressors, cryogenic pumps, variable high-speed motors/generators and machines.

== History ==
The company was formed in November 1994, by Hooshang Heshmat with James F. Walton II, Melissa D. Heshmat and Michael J. Tomaszewski, to develop oil-free, high-speed rotating machinery. Oil-free air or process gases are used in pharmaceutical, food and beverage processing, in medical equipment or devices, and other industrial processes. The company initially conducted research and development programs for the United States Department of Defense (DoD), NASA, the National Science Foundation (NSF), the National Institutes of Health (NIH) and the New York State Energy Research and Development Authority (NYSERDA) to assist in commercializing its technologies in the areas of tribology, foil bearings, magnetic bearings, auxiliary or backup bearings and advanced seals.

Mohawk Innovative has applied its technologies to rotating machinery systems with both domestic aerospace and major international companies. Developed oil-free systems have included motor driven air compressors for industrial use, cryogenic turboexpanders for generation of liquid oxygen and liquid nitrogen, motor driven air blowers for automotive fuel cells, motor driven blowers for use in the food and beverage industries, small gas turbine engines for UAVs and microturbine generators for distributed electricity generation using either natural gas or renewable energy sources. While conducting these research programs and working to apply the technology to product, alternative bearing coatings and test machine products have resulted. New high temperature, long life and low friction coefficient coatings were developed to support the bearing product. Also, a new tribometer was developed to evaluate the friction, wear lubrication characteristics and life of solid lubricant coatings, shaft coatings and bearing performance under realistic operating conditions of high speed, high load and high temperature conditions.

Medical applications of the company's products are marketed through the MiTiHeart Corporation, a spin-off company.

== See also ==
- Tribology

== Selected patents ==
- Multi-plane Balancing Process and Apparatus Using Powder Metal for Controlled Material Addition - Sept. 1992
- Stator Controlled Magnetic Bearing - Feb. 2001
- Hybrid Foil Magnetic Bearing - Mar. 2002
- Hybrid Foil Magnetic Bearing with Improved Load Sharing - Aug. 2004
