= David Bogy =

American professor of mechanical engineering

David B. Bogy
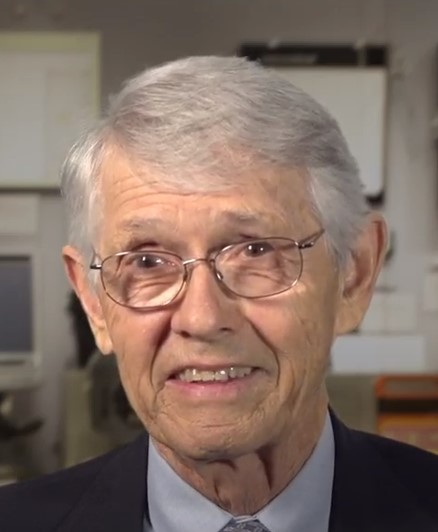
- Dave Bogy at the Computer History Museum in 2017
- Born: Wabbaseka, Arkansas
- Education: Rice University, Brown University
- Occupations: educator, mechanical engineer
- Employer: UC Berkeley
- Spouse: Patricia Lynn Pizzitola
- Awards: Member National Academy of Engineering, 1994; Fellow of IEEE; Fellow of ASME; IEEE Reynold B. Johnson Award, 2010

David Beauregard Bogy (Dave Bogy) is the William S. Floyd, Jr. Distinguished Professor of the Graduate School at the University of California, Berkeley (UCB). He is also the founder and head of the Computer Mechanics Laboratory (CML) at UCB.. He has made particular contributions in air-bearing analysis and design for the sliders that support the read/write heads in hard disk drives (HDD).

== Background and education ==
He attended the local school in Wabbaseka until 10th grade when he transferred to Columbia Military Academy, Tennessee joining the ROTC.

Bogy attended Rice University from 1954 to 1961. He received dual B.S. degrees in 1959 in mechanical engineering and geology and then went on to receive a M.S. degree in mechanical engineering in 1961. Between 1961 and 1963, he fulfilled an obligation to spend time in the US military and served in the US Corps of Engineers at Fort Leonard Wood. From 1963 to 1966, he attended Brown University where he received a Ph.D. in applied mathematics working on elasticity under Eli Sternberg. From 1966 to 1967, he was a postdoctoral fellow at the California Institute of Technology also studying under Sternberg. It was at this time, that he first gained recognition for his analysis of mechanical stress concentrations at sharp corners.

== Career ==
In 1967, Bogy interviewed with Paul Naghdi at the University of California, Berkeley and subsequently joined the Department of Mechanical Engineering where he has spent his entire career. He was promoted from assistant professor to associate professor in 1970 and then to full professor in 1975. From 1991 to 1999 he was chair of the Department of Mechanical Engineering. In 1993, he was appointed the William S. Floyd, Jr. Distinguished Professor.

Around 1972, Bogy took a summer position at IBM Research Almaden where he collaborated with Frank Talke and was introduced to magnetic recording as a discipline. By 1984, Bogy was actively working on Hard Disk Drive mechanics contracted out from the newly established Center for Magnetic Recording Research at UC San Diego. By 1989, Bogy had taken the initiative and established the Computer Mechanics Laboratory (CML) at Berkeley specifically to support the Hard Disk Drive (HDD) industry. It was one of the first research groups to employ laser Doppler vibrometry in HDD measurements. The center is now particularly noted for the software tools for the air-bearing design for the sliders that support the read/write heads. Recent work has addressed issues associated with Heat-Assisted Magnetic Recording.

Bogy has supervised some 66 Ph.D. degree students. About one third of these have gone on to become professors in research universities and most of the remainder work in the computer disk drive industry. Two notable students are George Adams and Richard Benson.

Bogy has authored or co-authored over 400 technical papers. The early papers were on mechanical stress and fluid flow (inkjet), but the majority since 1984 have focussed on the mechanics of hard disk drives and on the air-bearing design and dynamics of the slider and its interaction with the disk surface (the ceramic slider carries the read/write heads). Many of the papers are highly cited (h-index = 48).

== Awards ==
In 1992, Bogy was elevated to Fellow of American Society of Mechanical Engineers (ASME) in recognition of his "outstanding engineering achievements".

In 1994, Bogy became a member of the National Academy of Engineering for "research and professional leadership in the mechanics of computer technology". He was elected Chair of the Mechanical Engineering Section in 1997.

In 2010, Bogy received the IEEE Reynold B. Johnson Data Storage Device Technology Award for "leadership, education and technical contributions in the mechanics and tribiology of magnetic recording disk drives". Other contemporary awardees in HDD technology include Al Shugart, Mark Kryder, Chris Bajorek, and Mason Williams.

In 1999, he was the recipient of the American Society of Mechanical Engineers (ASME) Tribology Division Mayo D. Hersey Award. He has also served as Chair of the Executive Committees of the American Society of Mechanical Engineers' Division of Applied Mechanics and its Division of Tribology.

In 2010, Bogy received the Berkeley Citation and the Berkeley Faculty Service Award

Bogy is a Fellow of the American Academy of Mechanics (AAM).. He is also a Fellow of the Institute of Electrical and Electronics Engineers
