= Robert Carpick =

Robert W. Carpick
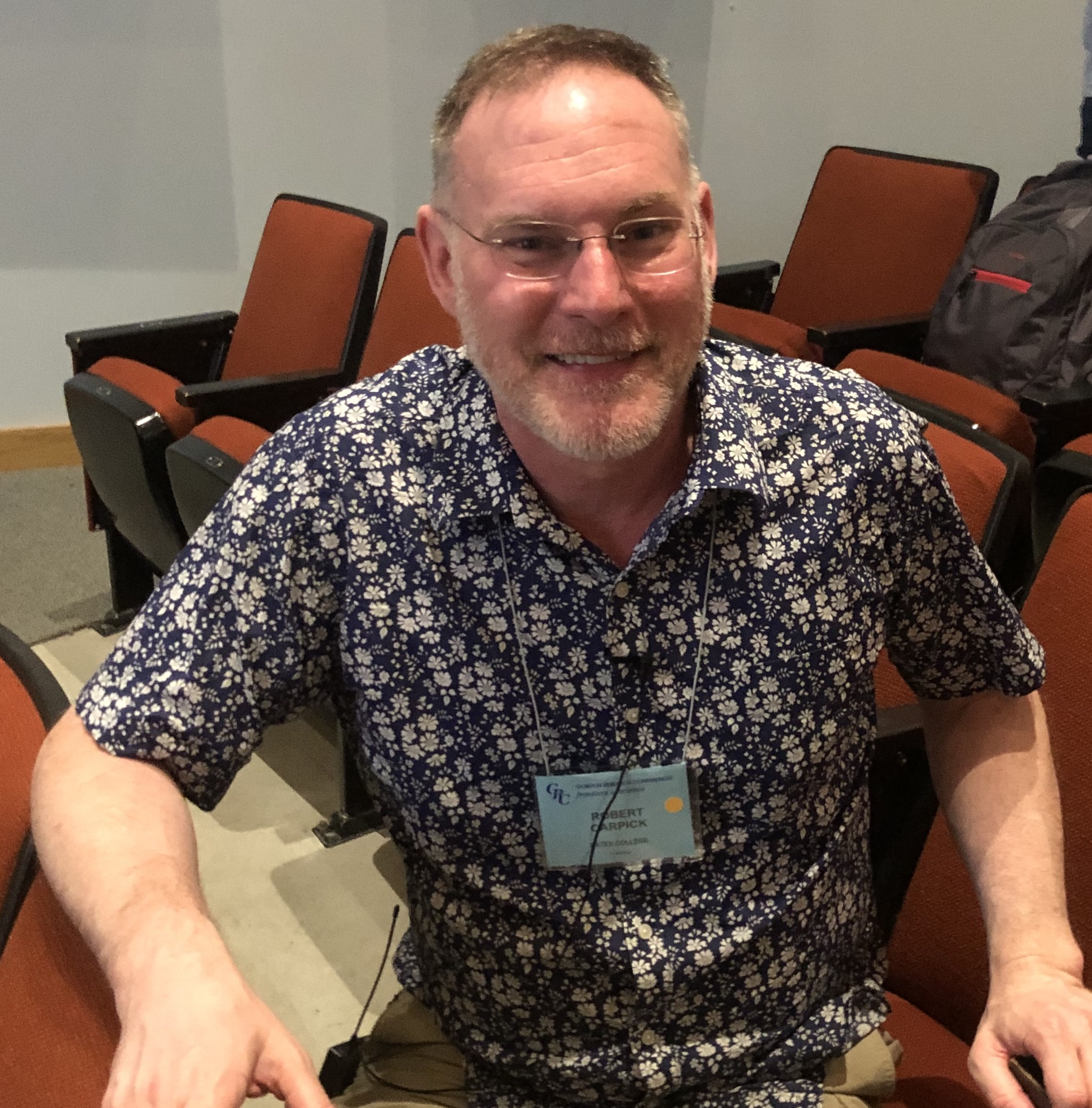
- Rob Carpick at the 2022 Tribology GRC (Lewiston, Maine)
- Citizenship: Canadian
- Education: University of Toronto; University of California, Berkeley
- Known for: Important discoveries in the field of nanotribology using AFM.
- Awards: 2009 ASME Burt L. Newkirk Award; 2014 Fellow, Society of Tribologists and Lubrication Engineers
- Scientific career
- Fields: Physics, mechanical engineering, materials science
- Workplaces: Sandia National Laboratories; University of Wisconsin, Madison; University of Pennsylvania
- Doctoral advisor: Miquel Salmeron

Robert William Carpick is a Canadian mechanical engineer. He is currently director of diversity, equity, and inclusion and John Henry Towne Professor in the Department of Mechanical Engineering and Applied Mechanics at the University of Pennsylvania. He is best known for his work in tribology, particularly nanotribology.

== Education ==
Carpick received his bachelor's degree in physics from the University of Toronto in 1991, and his master's degree and Doctor of Philosophy in physics from the University of California, Berkeley, in 1997. His thesis was entitled "The Study of Contact, Adhesion and Friction at the Atomic Scale by Atomic Force Microscopy". His PhD supervisor was Miquel Salmeron, who pioneered the use of atomic force microscopy (AFM) in tribology. During his PhD, Carpick devised a method to obtain reproducible and quantitative friction measurements using AFM.

== Research career ==
After his PhD, he spent two years as a postdoctoral appointee at Sandia National Laboratory in the Surface and Interface Science Department, and then the Biomolecular Materials and Interfaces Department, where he worked under the supervision of Dr Alan R. Burns. In 2000, he joined the faculty at the University of Wisconsin-Madison in the Engineering Physics Department. Carpick moved to the University of Pennsylvania in January 2007.

He has made a number of important discoveries in the field of nanotribology using AFM. These include that the friction of lamellar 2D-materials (e.g. graphene, molybdenum disulfide, niobium diselenide, and hexagonal boron nitride) increases as the number of layers decreases. He has shown that frictional ageing of the contacts between rock surfaces arises from the formation of interfacial chemical bonds. He found that the wear of AFM tips cannot be adequately described by macroscale models and instead is driven by nanoscale mechanochemical processes. His group has also given important insights into the mechochemical tribofilm formation of the lubricant antiwear additive zinc dialkyldithiophosphate (ZDDP). According to Google Scholar, as of 2021, his work had been cited on over 16,000 occasions.

== Honours and awards ==
Carpick was named a Fellow of the American Physical Society in 2012, a Fellow of the American Vacuum Society in 2014, a Fellow of the Society of Tribologists and Lubrication Engineers in 2016, a Fellow of the Materials Research Society in 2017, and a Fellow of the American Society of Mechanical Engineers (ASME) in 2019. He received a National Science Foundation CAREER Award in 2001, and was named Outstanding New Mechanics Educator by the American Society for Engineering Education in 2003. In 2009, he was awarded the ASME Burt L. Newkirk Award.

== Personal life ==
Carpick has been married to his partner since 2003. He is also a fan and practitioner of curling and the organ.
