= Carlos E. Santiago =

American economist

Carlos Enrique Santiago
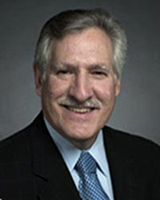
- Santiago in 2015

Commissioner of the Massachusetts Department of Higher Education
- Acting; July 2015 – June 2022
- Governor: Charlie Baker
- Preceded by: Richard M. Freeland
- Succeeded by: Noe Ortega

7th Chancellor of the University of Wisconsin–Milwaukee
- In office 2004–2010
- Preceded by: Nancy Zimpher
- Succeeded by: Michael Lovell

President of University at Albany Acting President of University at Albany
- In office February 1, 2004 – June 30, 2004
- Preceded by: Karen R. Hitchcock
- Succeeded by: John R. Ryan (interim)

Personal details
- Born: December 7, 1952 (age 73)
- Education: University of Miami; University of Puerto Rico; Cornell University
- Profession: College administrator, Academic

Carlos Enrique Santiago (born December 7, 1952) is a Puerto Rican American labor economist and the Commissioner of the Massachusetts Department of Higher Education (MDHE). Previously he was the chancellor of the University of Wisconsin–Milwaukee and the chief executive officer of the Hispanic College Fund.

Santiago is the author or co-author of six books and has published articles and book reviews, many of which focus on economic development and the changing socioeconomic status of Latinos in the United States. In 1996 and 2011, Santiago was named one of the 100 most influential Hispanics in the United States by Hispanic Business magazine.

== Background ==
Santiago was born and raised in Puerto Rico.

Santiago received a B.A. from the University of Miami, an M.A. from the University of Puerto Rico, and an M.A. and Ph.D. from Cornell University, all in economics. He was a Ford Foundation postdoctoral fellow at the Department of Economics and Economic Growth Center at Yale University.

He is a labor economist with expertise in the Caribbean and Central America regions, with a special emphasis on Puerto Rico. He was chair of the Department of Latin American & Caribbean Studies at the University at Albany from 1989 to 1991 and from 1993 to 1995. He is a founding co-editor of Latino Research Review and is a member of the U.S. Congressional Hispanic Caucus International Relations Advisory Group.

Santiago was twice named by Hispanic magazine as one of the United States' "100 most influential Hispanics".

== Academic administration ==
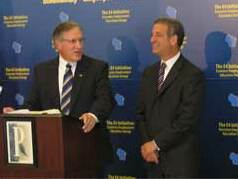
Santiago (left) with U.S. Senator Russ Feingold in 2008

Santiago taught at Wayne State University. He served as provost and vice president for academic affairs of the University at Albany, State University of New York.

From 2004 to 2010, he was the chancellor of the University of Wisconsin–Milwaukee and held a professorship within its Department of Economics. During his tenure at UW-Milwaukee, he raised 125 million dollars from the private sector for the school's research arm and advocated a 240 million dollar state-funded "UW-Milwaukee Initiative" campaign, before resigning to take the post at the Hispanic College Fund.

Santiago joined the Massachusetts Department of Higher Education in April 2013 as the senior deputy commissioner for academic affairs. In May 2023, Governor Charlie Baker nominated him to serve as commissioner, and the board unanimously confirmed him to serve in the position beginning at the start of July 2015 (after Richard M. Freeland's tenure was scheduled to end). At the start of 2022, Santiago announced his intentions to step down in June 2022.

== Personal life ==
A week after moving to Massachusetts in 2013, Santiago watched the 2013 Boston Marathon from a building near the finish line, and witnessed the 2013 Boston Marathon bombing.

== Bibliography ==
- Edna Acosta-Belén; Carlos Enrique Santiago (2006). Puerto Ricans in the United States: A Contemporary Portrait. Lynne Rienner Publishers. ISBN 978-1588264008.
- Francisco Rivera-Batiz; Carlos E. Santiago (21 November 1996). Island Paradox: Puerto Rico in the 1990s. Russell Sage Foundation. ISBN 978-0871547514.

Academic offices
Preceded by Karen R. Hitchcock	Acting President of University at Albany; February 1, 2004 – June 30, 2004	Succeeded by John R. Ryan (Interim)
Preceded by Nancy L. Zimpher	Chancellor of the University of Wisconsin–Milwaukee; July 15, 2004 – Oct. 1, 2010	Succeeded by Michael Lovell
Preceded by Joseph A. Petrone	Chief Executive Officer of the Hispanic College Fund; October 1, 2010 – 2013	Succeeded by Fidel A. Vargas
Preceded by Richard M. Freeland	Commissioner of the Massachusetts Department of Higher Education; July 2015 – June 2022	Succeeded by Noe Ortega
