= Kenneth G. Ryder =

American university president

Kenneth Gilmore Ryder

4th President of Northeastern University
- In office 1975–1989
- Preceded by: Asa S. Knowles
- Succeeded by: John A. Curry

Personal details
- Born: April 30, 1924 Brockton, Massachusetts
- Died: October 29, 2012 (aged 88)
- Education: Boston University, Harvard University

Kenneth Gilmore Ryder (April 30, 1924 – October 29, 2012) was the 4th president of Northeastern University, a post he held from 1975 to 1989. Ryder began his career in education as a history teacher in 1949 and moved into administration in 1955. As president of Northeastern, he contributed to the growth of the student population to nearly 50,000 students, a $43 million fund-raising drive, and the construction of nine campus buildings.

== Early life ==
Kenneth (Ken) Ryder was born on April 30, 1924, in Brockton, Massachusetts, to Russell Gilmore Ryder and Etta Carr Ryder. Russell Ryder (September 2, 1892 – January 25, 1965) was a veteran of World War I, serving in the 312th Field Signal Battalion as a signal officer in France during the war. Russell had learned the telegraph trade from his father and uncles who were all telegraph officers. For many years, Russell was a payroll officer for the C.S. Pierce Shoe Company, in Brockton, Massachusetts. During World War II, Russell Ryder put his telegraph skills to work again and was employed by the Submarine Signal Company of Boston helping with the war effort. Russell married Etta Coffin Carr (Dec. 19, 1888 – May 11, 1986) on July 19, 1921. Etta grew up in Brockton, Massachusetts, and graduated from Brockton High School in 1904. Etta and Russell had one child, Kenneth, in 1924.

Ken Ryder was a good student throughout his early years, excelling in history and public speaking. His public speaking ability was something that was honed as a part of the debate team and this was a skill that was admired throughout his lifetime. Ryder graduated from Brockton High School in 1940, giving the graduation address, and was named an Augustus Howe Buck Fellow, which included a full scholarship to Boston University. Ryder became the first in his family to attend college. (In later years his father received a law degree by correspondence, and Russell had hoped that Ken would go on to become a lawyer as well). Ryder once said, “My father thought law was the ideal profession, and it was there I set my sights."

But without the scholarship, there would have been no college and that fact shaped Ryder’s view of higher education for the rest of his life. "My father had lost his job, and I was working after school and summers to help out. I wanted to go to Harvard or Boston University, but I'd pretty much given up the idea of college at all. It was a teacher who urged me to apply to BU and it accepted me. Still, that wouldn't have been possible without the award. The fellowship shaped my view about the importance of helping people – whatever their financial background – to get a college education so they can develop their potential."

Ryder majored in History at Boston University and for the next six years, Ryder remained an August Buck Fellow, earning an A.B. from Boston University in 1946 and an M.A. from Harvard in 1947. His undergraduate studies took six years to complete because they were interrupted by the outbreak of World War II.

== Navy Service ==
Moved by the invasion of Pearl Harbor, Ryder signed up for the naval reserves a month after the attack, and enlisted in the Navy on December 10, 1942, at the age of 18. He took a leave from his junior year at Boston University and undertook months of naval training before being deployed to the Pacific. Training included a 32-week officer training class at Harvard University where he learned celestial navigation and naval communication. (From 1942–1943, Harvard University provided full-time instruction to Army and Navy servicemen who were part of the Army Specialized Training and the Navy V-12 Programs which were designed to supplement the force of commissioned officers in the United States Navy during World War II).

From the V-12 program, most of the Navy candidates went on to a four-month course at a reserve midshipmen's school, an indoctrination school for officers. Ryder’s four-month training was held at Camp MacDonough Midshipman School in Plattsburgh, NY. After leaving Camp MacDonough, Ryder was assigned as a naval officer on the USS Landing Craft Infantry (Large) 803 [(LCI (L) 803].

== World War II ==
In 1944 Ryder went into active service as a communications officer on the LCI(L) 803, a landing craft bound for the Pacific theater which would participate in the landing at Okinawa. There were three officers and twenty-five enlisted men in the original crew of the LCI(L) 803. On August 20, 1944, Ryder and the rest of the ship’s crew completed its training and received orders to report to New York for the outfitting and commissioning of LCI (L) 803.

The following is an excerpt of the History of the LCI (L) 803 compiled by William F. Confalone: A full history of the LCI (L) 803's service in World War II can be found at: http://www.navsource.net/archives/10/15/150803h.htm

“On Saturday, September 2, 1944, after a thorough inspection of the ship by the prospective Commanding Officer, the crew was mustered on the gun deck. Lt. Comdr. J.A. Jordan read his orders from the Chief of Naval Operations to accept the USS LCI (L) 803 for the Navy and placed the ship in full commission. ...

On December 7 the LCI (L) 803 reported to San Pedro, California, where at the Craig Shipbuilding she was converted to an LCI (M). With conversion to a mortar ship, the 803’s complement was increased. Twenty-five new enlisted men were received aboard in the last two weeks of December. Final preparations for going to sea were completed in early January. On January 6, 1945, this ship departed from San Pedro, California for Pearl Harbor, T.H. in company with eleven other LCI’s. ...

The 803’s first action was in support of the landing operations at Purple Beach on Zamami Shima. The landing was successful and little enemy opposition was observed. On the 27th. this ship supported the attack on Takashiki Shima. The results were the same. On the second day considerably more accuracy was attained with the mortar fire. The assigned target area was blanketed with hits.

On the morning of April 7. the 803 was proceeding in Nago Wan to join the other ships of her division. Shortly after 0400 a Japanese aircraft dive-bombed the ship from directly ahead. The heavy bomb exploded less than 50 years off the port quarter of the ship. No casualties were suffered....

On April 28. the ship was again dive-bombed, again without suffering damage. The bombing occurred while the 803 was on patrol near Ie Shima. The bomb struck the water 75 to 100 yards astern. On the 29th. of April the 803 discontinued the active patrolling and took an anchored screening station in the anchorage south of Ie Shima. Throughout May and until June 14. she remained on this duty. Some of the bitterest air attacks occurred during the first weeks of May. The gun crews were often at their stations throughout most of the night. Numerous Kamikaze plane attacks were made in the vicinity of Ie Shima. Most LCI’s escaped such attacks however because of their small size and the presence in the area of more desirable targets....

The men aboard the 803 were awaiting orders to invade Japan when the City of Hiroshima was bombed on August 7, 1945. As a result, "The 803 was released from duty at Okinawa on August 13. and returned to Leyte for necessary repairs and equally necessary relaxation for the men. The stay at Leyte was cut short by the official end of the war. The 803 returned to Okinawa on September 6. to prepare for the coming occupation of China. The trip to Okinawa was difficult one as the ships sailed into the path of a typhoon. Considerable time was lost and several days of rough weather were experienced. A second typhoon was ridden out in Buckner Bay a week after arriving at the island. The ship survived the second typhoon with little damage except the loss of two anchors. ...

The 803 left Okinawa in convoy on September 25. en route to Taku Bay, China. The First Marines were landed in the Tientsin area on September 30. and the 803 participated in landing troops during the first week of October. ...At the end of the month of November the 803 discontinued her duty as a liberty ship and on order made ready for sea." Ryder returned with the 803 to the United States, mustering out as a Lieutenant junior grade in 1946.

As stated by Antoinette Fredrick in her book on the history of Northeastern University, Coming of Age: The Ryder Years, “The war had brought the young lieutenant into firsthand contact with one of the momentous conflicts of western civilization, and this, along with American history, became the focus of his academic career. 'It also made me realize I never wanted to fight with anyone," he was to say later. "I've seldom met anyone I didn't like and no one that I ever wanted to get mad at. The war confirmed that sense in me – that issues can be settled by discussion.'" This became the defining character trait that guided his life—placid, thoughtful and unflappable, Ryder seldom argued or raised his voice, but could stand his ground and calmly debate the issues that mattered to him.

== Military Awards and Medal ==
Ryder was awarded a star for participation in the Asiatic-Pacific Area, and a star for the Philippine Liberation. He also awarded for the American Area and the World War II victory.

== Work at Northeastern University ==
After returning from World War II, Ryder returned to BU where he graduated with a BA in history in 1946. Ryder then enrolled in a Masters Program in History at Harvard University.

While working on his masters, Ryder began teaching at Cambridge Junior College and in 1949, accepted a position at Northeastern University as a history and government instructor. He was a well-liked professor, full of enthusiasm for learning, and for the needs of his students. Ryder often spent a good deal of time with his students, counseling them on academic and non-academic matters, and he was widely admired for his love of history and relaxed, but effective manner in the classroom. In 1953 he was promoted to assistant professor and then to associate professor in 1956. In the following year, Ryder began to take on more administrative roles at the University first serving as faculty advisor of the freshman class and as Secretary to the faculty. In 1958, Ryder gave up the teaching side of his responsibilities altogether and was named Dean of Administration (1958–1966). In 1967 he became Vice President of University Administration (1967–1970), and Executive Vice President in 1971. 1975, largely due to his knowledge of the university administration and its procedures, his affection for the needs of the student body, and his close ties to the faculty, Ryder was named the fourth president of Northeastern by the Board of Trustees after the retirement of Asa Knowles.

The face of Northeastern, both academically and physically, changed dramatically during Ryder’s tenure. Northeastern’s academic programs, as well as the physical campus, were expanded and improved and Ryder is largely credited with turning the once cold and asphalt-covered landscape of white brick buildings into a campus full of flowers, grass and trees. By the last year of his presidency in 1989, over 19 academic centers and research institutes had been established, honors programs developed, satellite locations had been created, and numerous buildings added to the main campus. In addition to new academic structures, Boston Arena, the former home of the Boston Bruins and Boston Celtics, was purchased from the Commonwealth of Massachusetts in 1982 and became Matthews Arena, the home of the Northeastern Huskies Hockey Team. However, despite this success of campus expansion, Ryder was well aware that Northeastern could not become a first class university without a first class library for their students. The existing library was too small for the needs of the University, and from the early days of his presidency, Ryder undertook the goal of having a new library constructed.

“Ryder was adamant: a new library absolutely had to be built. Although no funding was in sight, a two-phase invitational design competition was launched in 1981. In January 1983, the Architects Collaborative was awarded the commission for a five-story, 240,000-square-foot (22,000 m^{2}) library.

Not until September 1986, after three years of intensive work, was sufficient funding secured-$13.5 million from the Department of Defense and $5 million from trustee and graduate George Snell-to inspire hope that the project would take concrete form. Another year elapsed before groundbreaking and another three years before the library finally opened in the fall of 1990. Although President Ryder retired in 1989, the dedication of the library a year later must be seen as the crowning achievement of his presidency.”

In addition to physical expansion, Ryder was committed to improving the quality and scope of the academic programs offered at Northeastern as well. Having come from the History department, he was personally committed to establishment and expansion of academic programs in the arts and humanities. In addition to these areas, he also understood that Northeastern, with its long history of quality engineering programs, could play a role in the emerging technology fields. The first modern computer equipment was installed at the University under Ryder, and Northeastern established the nation's first College of Computer Science in 1982. Research programs also increased during Ryder’s administration. In 1978 the University Council on Research and Scholarship was established to promote development of research and scholarship activities.

Always a teacher at heart, Ryder also worked to improve the quality of teaching at Northeastern. In 1978, he founded the Excellence in Teaching Awards, a merit program to recognize teachers, and in 1983, he established the Instructional Development Fund to encourage teachers to improve the quality of their teaching through experimentation with instructional content, innovative procedures, or technological resources.

During his time as president, Ryder put particular focus on the role Northeastern could play as a leader in cooperative education, a program that had long been a crucial means of helping Northeastern students pay for their academic course work while in school. Ryder wanted to shift the attitude around cooperative education away from a means of financing higher education, and focus more on the educational enrichment and job placement opportunities that the program could provide. As a result, co-op placements expanded both in number and in variety and Ryder made great strides in reaching out to employers to participate in the program. Ryder also took an active role in expanding cooperative education nationally and internationally. In 1981, Ryder became the founding chairman of the World Council on Cooperative Education conference (now the World Association on Cooperative Education), an international conference to expand and promote cooperative education at universities worldwide.

Ryder also believed strongly that Northeastern should play a role in the community it inhabited. Looking for ways to develop strong relations between NU and the local community, in 1976 he created the Office of Community Development (renamed the Office of Community Affairs in 1981) to work on various community projects. In 1975, under Ryder’s leadership Northeastern participated in Phase II of the Boston public schools desegregation plan in which 21 Boston area colleges and universities each paired up with a specific Boston public school to assist in educational development. NU was paired with Madison Park High School in District 7. NU also participated in the Southwest Corridor Project, an economic and environmental urban renewal project to improve Boston's transportation by developing the land near NU's property into residential, commercial, and light industrial enterprises. In 1986 the Ruggles Street MBTA Station was created.

Ryder also understood the importance of having close and working relationships with elected officials at all levels of government. In 1979, he established the Office of Government Relations as a means to bring the concerns of the Northeastern community to City Hall, the United States Congress, and the Massachusetts State House.

Ryder was well liked by all who knew him because of his easy going attitude, but he could command a room with his speaking style. “Ken was a tremendous speaker. His voice was resonant, his tone perfectly pitched. He managed to sound as if he were talking one on one even if he were behind a podium and there were 800 people on the other side, or if he were at a desk and there were 40 faculty senators facing him, or if he were at a table confronting six agenda committee members. Ken always sounded extemporaneous. He never gave canned speeches. He didn't read from a text, he looked up, made eye contact and spoke.

“This speaking talent, which has been remarked on by almost everyone who ever heard Ryder speak, gave his hearers the sense that their president was actually talking to rather than at them and went a long way toward establishing rapport.”

After 40 years of service to Northeastern, fourteen of which he had served as president, Ryder submitted his resignation to NU's board of trustees in 1989. After stepping down as president, Ryder became chancellor when John A. Curry, a former NU administrator, was appointed as his successor. Ryder retired from Northeastern in 2004 at the age of 80, having served Northeastern for 55 years.

Ryder died on October 29, 2012, at the age of 88.

== Publications ==
1986 Cooperative Education in a New Era, Kenneth G. Ryder, James W. Wilson and Associates.

== Organizations ==
- Trustee emeritus, WGBH
- Founding chairman of the World Council on Cooperative Education conference

== Awards ==
- Ryder Hall (Arts and Humanities Classroom), named for Ken Ryder upon his resignation as president in 1989.
- Mt Ryder, A small oval of land centrally located at Northeastern’s main entrance was refurbished by the donations of the graduating class of 1989
- Honorary Degrees from:
  - 1985, UMass Amherst
  - 1988, Columbia College Chicago (Dizzy Gillespie also honored that year)
  - 1989, Boston College, Doctor of Science in Education
- Boston Center for Community and Justice (BCCJ) Opening Boston Award, 1983. Kenneth G Ryder Honored with: John M. Connors Jr., Michael S. Dukakis and Henry L. Foster
- Boston University Arts & Sciences Distinguished Alumni Award
- Greater Boston Chamber of Commerce Academy of Distinguished Bostonians, 1989.Every year since 1983, the Greater Boston Chamber inducts one or more accomplished citizens into the Academy of Distinguished Bostonians. Kenneth G Ryder was named a Distinguished Bostonian in 1989.
- Hecht-Shaw Award from the Lena Park Community Development Corporation, 1992

Academic offices
Preceded by Asa S. Knowles	4th President of Northeastern University; 1975–1989	Succeeded by John A. Curry
