= IEEEmadC =

Technical award

IEEEmadC (Mobile Applications Development Contest) is an international contest organized by volunteers for IEEE student members across the globe. The main goal is to educate and encourage students to pursue their future career as mobile application developers, develop their engineering, social and team skills and consequently become more competitive in the labor market. The contest is organized online with three phases: Education and Idea, Development and Judging stage. Teams up to three IEEE student members are invited to devise and develop mobile applications. Develop a mobile app and win big prizes SIX criteria will be judged: UI Design, User Experience, Usefulness, Availability, Number of supported platforms and Open source support.

== History ==
IEEEmadC started in the fall of 2013 from University of J.J.Strossmayer Student Branch in Osijek, Croatia. Contest was founded by Josip Balen, Luka Horvat and Igor Bedek with support from IEEE R8 Student Activities Committee. The first iteration of the contest was for IEEE students in Europe, Africa and the Middle East (Region 8). The second iteration of the contest was organized worldwide for IEEE student members in all 10 IEEE regions. IEEEmadC is enjoying its 3rd year of competition in 2016.

== Received honours ==
MGA Innovation Award - December 2017

For implementing a worldwide mobile application development contest to encourage member and industry engagement.

The Darrel Chong Student Activity Award – December 2014.

“The purpose of this recognition system serves to change the mindset of our student groups from being number-driven to becoming value-driven and to acknowledge exemplary student activities around the world.”

IEEE Student Enterprise Award – September 2013.

“The IEEE Student Enterprise Award provides financial help to Student members who are looking to implement an idea for a project. It enables IEEE Student members to work with others on an engineering project while simultaneously strengthening Student Branch programs.”

== Contest stages ==
=== Education stage ===
The main goals of the Educational stage are to educate and encourage students to become MAD (Mobile Application Developers), develop their engineering, social and team skills and consequently become more competitive in the labor market. During this stage IEEEmadC ambassadors with experts from industry organize webinars on mobile application development. Furthermore, with help from university professors they are organizing technical workshops and lectures in their local IEEE sections, universities and IEEE student branches around the globe.

=== Idea stage ===
In this stage students are able to register by submitting their ideas about mobile applications that they would like to develop. All ideas will be evaluated within few days from submission and if accepted, participants can start with the application development.Apply Now.

=== Development stage ===
Teams whose ideas have been approved will be eligible to submit their apps and other necessary attachments:

- Screenshots of the working application (minimum 4)
- Link to the short video showing features of the application (between 30-120 sec.)
- Application installation files (.apk, .ipa, .xap...)
- Short (450 words max.) description of usefulness and technical approach and tools used while developing the application
- Link to the online repository(s) of the application (if the code is published online)
