= Office of Community Development =

Part of the U.S. department of Agriculture's Rural Development activities

The Office of Community Development (OCD) is a part of the U.S. Department of Agriculture's Rural Development activities. OCD operates community development programs and initiatives throughout rural America and provides technical support to USDA-Rural Development's community development staff in offices throughout the United States.
