= Richard M. Freeland =

American academic administrator

Richard Middleton Freeland

Commissioner of the Massachusetts Department of Higher Education
- In office 2008–2015
- Succeeded by: Carlos E. Santiago

6th President of Northeastern University
- In office 1996–2006
- Preceded by: John A. Curry
- Succeeded by: Joseph Aoun

Personal details
- Born: May 13, 1941 (age 85) Orange, New Jersey, U.S.
- Education: Amherst College; University of Pennsylvania

Richard Middleton Freeland (born May 13, 1941) was president of Northeastern University from 1996 to 2006 and served as the Commissioner of Higher Education for Massachusetts from 2008 until 2015.

== Early life and career ==
Freeland grew up in Mountain Lakes, New Jersey, and was a 1959 graduate of Mountain Lakes High School; he was inducted into the school's hall of fame in 2014. He was granted a bachelor's degree in American Studies from Amherst College and a doctorate in American Civilization from the University of Pennsylvania.

Freeland is married to Elsa Nunez and has two children. Freeland's maternal grandmother Georgie Boynton Child was the author of The Efficient Kitchen: Definite Directions for the Planning, Arranging, and Equipping of the Modern Labor Saving Kitchen; A Practical Book for the Homemaker (1914)

During Freeland's tenure, Northeastern University went through major institutional changes, including becoming a more selective institution, switching from quarters to semesters, and opening over $400 million in new facilities.

== Books ==
- The Truman Doctrine and the Origins of McCarthyism (1972)
- Academia's Golden Age: Universities in Massachusetts, 1945-1970 (1992)
- Transforming the Urban University: Northeastern, 1996-2006 (2019) University of Pennsylvania Press ISBN 978-0812251210

Academic offices
Preceded by John A. Curry	6th President of Northeastern University; 1996–2006	Succeeded by Joseph Aoun
