= Carl Ell =

American academic administrator (1887–1981)

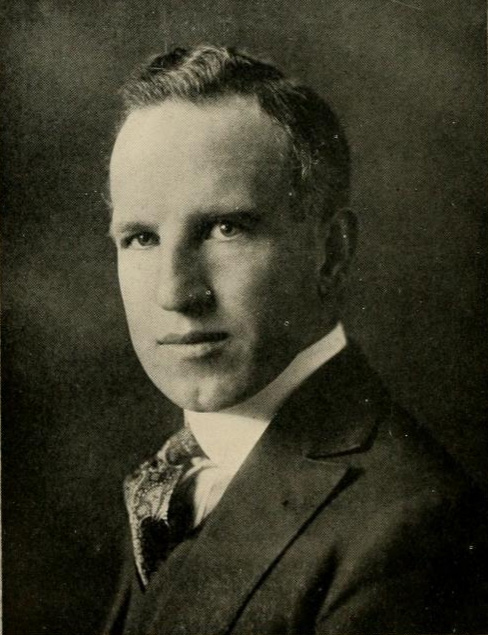
- Ell pictured in The Cauldron 1921, Northeastern yearbook

2nd President of Northeastern University
- In office 1940–1959
- Preceded by: Frank Palmer Speare
- Succeeded by: Asa S. Knowles

Personal details
- Born: November 14, 1887 Staunton, Indiana
- Died: April 17, 1981 (aged 93)
- Education: DePauw University, Massachusetts Institute of Technology, Harvard University

Carl Stephens Ell (November 14, 1887 – April 17, 1981) was the second president of Northeastern University in Boston, Massachusetts, from 1940 to 1959.

He was born in Staunton, Indiana on November 14, 1887, son of Jacob and Alice (Stephens) Ell. His education included an A.B. in 1909 from DePauw University, a S.B. in 1911 and M.S. in 1912 in Civil Engineering from the Massachusetts Institute of Technology and an Ed.M. in 1932 from Harvard University. He married Etta May Kinnear on June 10, 1913, and had one daughter, Dorothy. He began teaching at Northeastern in 1910, was dean of the School of Engineering 1917–1940, vice president 1925–1940, and president from 1940 to 1958. He remained affiliated with the university until his death on April 17, 1981.

The university named two buildings after Ell: the Ell Center (now the Curry Student Center) and Ell Hall.

During his presidency, he led the university through a period of physical expansion as well as the development of Northeastern's various colleges, the growth of its co-op program, student population, evening education, and educational status.

Academic offices
Preceded by Frank Palmer Speare	2nd President of Northeastern University; 1940–1959	Succeeded by Asa S. Knowles
