= George G. Adams (engineer) =

American mechanical engineer (born 1948)

George G. Adams (born 1948) is an American mechanical engineer specializing in tribology, contact mechanics, dynamics, and microelectromechanical systems (MEMS). He is a distinguished professor in the Mechanical and Industrial Engineering department at Northeastern University, Boston. Together with João Arménio Correia Martins, he discovered the frictional dynamic instabilities or Adams-Martins instabilities. Adams has published more than 120 papers in peer-reviewed journals, presenting new mathematical solutions of fundamental problems of mechanics, such as the dynamics of elastic structures subjected to moving loads, the contact of elastic plates with account to the adhesion force, as well as his studies of adhesion in MEMS microswitches and of contact mechanics. He has had many government and industry contracts and research grants.

Adams has a BS degree in Mechanical Engineering from Cooper Union (1969), and MS (1972) and PhD (1975) degrees in Mechanical Engineering (Applied Mechanics) from the University of California at Berkeley, where his advisor was David B. Bogy. Adams is also an educator and administrator. He a fellow of the Society of Tribologists and Lubrication Engineers and of the American Society of Mechanical Engineers (ASME), where he is chair of the Executive Committee of the Tribology Division and founded its Contact Mechanics Technical Committee.
