= IEEEXtreme =

Technical competition

IEEEXtreme (often abbreviated as Xtreme) is an annual hackathon and competitive programming challenge in which teams of IEEE Student members, often supported by an IEEE Student Branch and proctored by an IEEE member, compete in a 24-hour time span against each other to solve a set of programming problems. The competition is underwritten and coordinated by IEEE's Membership and Geographic Activities department, and is often supported by partnering sponsors, like IEEE Computer Society.

== History ==
IEEEXtreme was created in 2006 by Marko Delimar and Ricardo Varela who, at the time, were with the IEEE Student Activities Committee. The first instance of IEEEXtreme was held in 2006 with a global participation of 44 teams and 150 contestants. The numbers more than tripled the second time it was held, in 2008, to 130 teams with 500 participants. The iteration of IEEEXtreme in 2015, enjoyed the registration of over 2,300 teams, participation of over 1,900 teams, 5,500+ student competitors, 600+ proctors, and 100+ volunteers around the world.

== Competition rules ==
Teams of up to three student IEEE members receive sets of programming problems over 24 hours, starting at 0:00 UTC on the competition date. All teams receive the same problems to solve and are expected to solve the problems without direct outside consultation. Teams don't need to tackle every problem, but the more they solve, the more points they score. Students submit their solutions using an online tool, which has been HackerRank in recent years. Points are awarded based on how the problem was solved, the time it took, and its difficulty. Higher-grade IEEE members serve as judges and proctors for the competition.

The competition is free, but IEEE Student Membership is required to participate. Students - undergraduate and graduate - are welcome to register as IEEE Student Members and participants in IEEEXtreme on the same day. The cost of IEEE Student Membership varies from country to country.

== Yearly results ==
=== IEEEXtreme 12.0 (2018) ===
IEEEXtreme 12.0 was held on 19 October 2018.

Rank	Team Name	University	IEEE Region	Country
1	WildCornAncestors	University of Illinois - Urbana	4	USA
2	FatCat	China Univ Of Electronic Science And Tech UESTC	0	China
3	TiredOfWinning	Ecole Polytechnique Federale de Lausanne (EPFL)	8	Switzerland
4	AuroraPSUT	Princess Sumaya University for Technology	8	Jordan
5	Mayday	Georgia Institute of Technology	3	USA
6	DoubleCycleCover	University of Tartu	8	Estonia
7	Aposentados	Univ Federal do Rio Grande do Norte	9	Brazil
8	ZhenXiang	China Univ Of Electronic Science And Tech UESTC	0	China
9	BordoBereliler	Bilkent University	8	Turkey
10	YoungSimpleNaive	Rice Univ	5	USA
11	QuartetoDegenerado	Escola Politecnica Univ De São Paulo	9	Brazil
12	TukangSulap	Institut Teknologi Bandung	0	Indonesia
13	Profiler	Chulalongkorn Univ	0	Thailand
14	TeamSkyy	Jordan University of Science & Technology	8	Jordan
15	Antoine	American University-Beirut	8	Lebanon
16	UBCENPH	University Of British Columbia	7	Canada
17	AcarajeComFarofa	Univ Federal Da Bahia	9	Brazil
18	HMIFTriple	Institut Teknologi Bandung	0	Indonesia
19	WinFirstSearch	National Technical University of Athens	8	Greece
20	LaSenhoraKruskal	Universidad Peruana de Ciencias Applicadas	9	Peru
21	Mathos1	Osijek University Of Josip Juraj Strossmayer	8	Croatia
22	RavenclawBUET	Bangladesh Univ Of Engineering & Tech	0	Bangladesh
23	AzharPlusPlus	Al-Azhar Univ	8	Egypt
24	ILoveJianbeiAn	University of Auckland	0	New Zealand
25	zoids	Universidad Nacional de Ingenieria - Lima	9	Peru

=== IEEEXtreme 11.0 (2017) ===
IEEEXtreme 11.0 was held on 14 October 2017.

Rank	Team Name	University	IEEE Region	Country
1	whatevs	Ecole Polytechnique Federale de Lausanne (EPFL)	8	Switzerland
2	PoemAndWine	China Univ Of Electronic Science And Tech UESTC	10	China
3	GT	Georgia Institute of Technology	3	USA
4	AingeST	Institut Teknologi Bandung	10	Indonesia
5	StarCloud	China Univ Of Electronic Science And Tech UESTC	10	China
6	xiaopiqiu	Peking Univ	10	China
7	EZIEEE80211	Chulalongkorn Univ	10	Thailand
8	TargetBill	China Univ Of Electronic Science And Tech UESTC	10	China
9	Alkaid	China Univ Of Electronic Science And Tech UESTC	10	China
10	Oblivious	China Univ Of Electronic Science And Tech UESTC	10	China
11	VertexCover	University of Tartu	8	Estonia
12	gingacomtapioca	Univ Federal do Rio Grande do Norte	9	Brazil
13	AuroraPSUT	Princess Sumaya University for Technology	8	Jordan
14	HashArnabit	American Univ Of Beirut	8	Lebanon
15	Optimizers	Chulalongkorn Univ	10	Thailand
16	MenuOnBites	University of Tartu	8	Estonia
17	BothFirstSoap	Chulalongkorn Univ	10	Thailand
18	NissimAndHisWhales	Univ Federal Da Bahia	9	Brazil
19	LasAguilasDeLaPUCP	Pontifica Universidad Catolica del Peru	9	Peru
20	HybridCode	Pontifica Universidad Catolica del Peru	9	Peru
21	NoMeJalesTino	Universidad Nacional de Ingenieria - Lima	9	Peru
22	PersueychUN	Univ Nacional De Colombia Sede Bogota	9	Colombia
23	UCIrvine76ers	Univ of California-Irvine	6	USA
24	HackRush	Universidad Nacional de Ingenieria - Lima	9	Peru
25	CodeRunner	Ain Shams Univ	8	Egypt

=== IEEEXtreme 10.0 (2016) ===
IEEEXtreme 10.0 was held on 22 October 2016.

Rank	Team Name	University	IEEE Region	Country
1	TeamEPFL1	Ecole Polytechnique Federale de Lausanne (EPFL)	8	Switzerland
2	TeamMabva	Sharif University of Technology	8	Iran
3	VertexCover	University of Tartu	8	Estonia
4	IEEEXtremists	Monash University - Clayton	10	Australia
5	BreakFastSearch	Monash University - Clayton	10	Australia
6	Mobius97860	IPontifica Universidad Catolica del Peru	9	Peru
7	EachHappi	China Univ Of Electronic Science And Tech UESTC	10	China
8	MasterSamurai	Princess Sumaya University for Technology	8	Jordan
9	NissimAndYourWha	Univ Federal Da Bahia	9	Brazil
10	HybridCode	Pontifica Universidad Catolica de	9	Peru
11	AgeOfUN	Univ Nacional De Colombia Sede Bogota	9	Colombia
12	CUdebuggers	Chulalongkorn Univ	10	Thailand
13	AingeCP	Institut Teknologi Bandung	10	Indonesia
14	Twilightuse	China Univ Of Electronic Science And Tech UESTC	10	China
15	1000KB	Univ Nacional de Ingenieria	9	Peru
16	Teamcake	University of Canterbury	10	New Zealand
17	CarpeDiem	Univ Nacional de Ingenieria	9	Peru
18	Winnerwing	China Univ Of Electronic Science And Tech UESTC	10	China
19	LifeandLemons	China Univ Of Electronic Science And Tech UESTC	10	China
20	firefly	China Univ Of Electronic Science And Tech UESTC	10	China
21	uestccwt	China Univ Of Electronic Science And Tech UESTC	6	China
22	Biotec	Cajamarca Univ Nacional De	9	Peru
23	GantengGantengKo	Institut Teknologi Bandung	10	Indonesia
24	TeamSnake	Sharif University of Technology	8	Iran
25	TeamEZAC	Chulalongkorn Univ	10	Thailand

=== IEEEXtreme 9.0 (2015) ===
IEEEXtreme 9.0 was held on 27 October 2015.

Rank	Team Name	University	IEEE Region	Country
1	TeamName	Sharif University of Technology	8	Iran
2	EPFL1	Ecole Polytechnique Federale de Lausanne (EPFL)	8	Switzerland
3	Powerhouse	Politehnica University of Bucharest	8	Romania
4	DELAPAN3gp	Institut Teknologi Bandung	10	Indonesia
5	IamSuaAndorinhaMae	University of São Paulo	9	Brazil
6	AingeCP	Institut Teknologi Bandung	10	Indonesia
7	JUIITCoders	Jahangirnagar University	10	Bangladesh
8	Benchwarmers	Minnesota University of - Twin Cities	4	USA
9	HybridCode	Pontifica Universidad Catolica del Peru	9	Peru
10	AcarajeComFarofa	University Federal Da Bahia	9	Brazil
11	SorryHybridCode	Pontifica Universidad Catolica del Peru	9	Peru
12	HackRush	University Nacional de Ingenieria	9	Peru
13	UPPG	University of The Philippines-Diliman	10	Philippines
14	RJK	Institut Teknologi Bandung	10	Indonesia
15	HelloWorld	Instituto Tecnologico de Buenos Aires	9	Argentina
16	CUCPMeowMeow	Chulalongkorn University	10	Thailand
17	EarlGrey	Princess Sumaya University for Technology	8	Jordan
18	MonashMS	Monash University - Clayton	10	Australia
19	GoodGame	Xidian University	10	China
20	Fate	Xidian University	10	China
21	Kadkhoda	Sharif University of Technology	8	Iran
22	GantengGantengKoder	Institut Teknologi Bandung	10	Indonesia
23	CoDeFX	Sharif University of Technology	8	Iran
24	TnTWizard	North Carolina State University	3	USA
25	PlasticSpirit	Xidian University	10	China

=== IEEEXtreme 8.0 (2014) ===
IEEEXtreme 8.0 was held on 18 October 2014.

Rank	Team Name	University	IEEE Region	Country
1	viRUs	Reykjavik University	8	Iceland
2	WhySoConcrete	New York University	1	USA
3	oops	University of Moratuwa	10	Sri Lanka
4	SYSUillidan	Sun Yat-Sen University-Guangzhou	10	China
5	FZL	Sun Yat-Sen University-Guangzhou	10	China
6	OnionJAM	Ecole Polytechnique Federale de Lausanne (EPFL)	8	Switzerland
7	UPPG	University Of The Philippines-Diliman	10	Philippines
8	Powerhouse	Politehnica University Of Bucharest	8	Romania
9	SKT1	Universidad Nacional de Ingenieria	9	Peru
10	kwjIGo6KQFrCgEpf4O7g	University Of Southampton	8	United Kingdom
11	NowWith3	University of São Paulo	9	Brazil
12	FortyTwoASU	Ain Shams University	8	Egypt
13	Single	McGill University	7	Canada
14	FooBarBaz	Ecole Polytechnique Federale de Lausanne (EPFL)	8	Switzerland
15	Ewoks	University of Moratuwa	10	Sri Lanka
16	Dongskar	Institut Teknologi Bandung	10	Indonesia
17	NoGuessingNoParty	Universidad Nacional de Ingenieria	9	Peru
18	DELAPAN3gp	Institut Teknologi Bandung	10	Indonesia
19	Benchwarmers	University of Minnesota- Twin Cities	4	USA
20	HikeToTheStars	Ecole Polytechnique Federale de Lausanne (EPFL)	8	Switzerland
21	UCICommandoSquad	University of California-Irvine	6	USA
22	Raaliroimarid	Tartu University	8	Estonia
23	2014Xtreme41	Amirkabir Univ Of Technology-Tehran	8	Iran
24	SarajevoDragons	Sarajevo University	8	Bosnia and Herzegovina
25	NoNeedForSpeed	Princess Sumaya University for Technology	8	Jordan

=== IEEEXtreme 7.0 (2013) ===
IEEEXtreme 7.0 was held on 26 October 2013.

Rank	Team Name	University	IEEE Region	Country
1	cofrades	Universidad Nacional de Ingenieria	9	Peru
2	FINKI01	University Sts. Cyril and Methodius	8	Macedonia
3	Illidan	Sun Yat-sen University	10	China
4	DanceParty	Reykjavik University	8	Iceland
5	Escape	Ecole Polytechnique Federale de Lausanne (EPFL)	8	Switzerland
6	Powerhouse	Politehnica University Of Bucharest	8	Romania
7	SKT1	Universidad Nacional de Ingenieria	9	Peru
8	TeamCurtis	Iowa State University	4	USA
9	CJI	Institut Teknologi Bandung	10	Indonesia
10	ACM1PT	Universidad Nacional de Ingenieria	9	Peru
11	ManiACs	Universidad Nacional de Ingenieria	9	Peru
12	machan	University of Moratuwa	10	Sri Lanka
13	zh3	McGill University	7	Canada
14	ForkBomb	University Of Auckland	10	New Zealand
15	CumiLompat	Institut Teknologi Bandung	10	Indonesia
16	Aparon	Amirkabir University Of Technology	8	Iran
17	Expialidocious	Alexandria University	8	Egypt
18	BJUTSteinsGate	Beijing University of Technology	10	China
19	RainbowDash	The Australian National University	10	Australia
20	UK1	University of Kentucky	3	USA
21	i2ks2azmn88543o3n02r	University Of Southampton	8	United Kingdom
22	TwilightSparkle	The Australian National University	10	Australia
23	2014Xtreme41	CVAProgrammers	8	Sweden
24	1729	University of Moratuwa	10	Sri Lanka
25	SharpSharks	University of Moratuwa	10	Sri Lanka

=== IEEEXtreme 3.0 (2009) ===
IEEEXtreme 3.0 was held on 24 October 2009.

Rank	Team Name	University	IEEE Region	Country
1	MoraSeekers	University of Moratuwa	10	Sri Lanka

== See also ==
- Competitive programming, a type of mind sport involved in programming competitions
