= Hooshang Heshmat =

Hooshang Heshmat is an American mechanical engineer. He was the CEO (1994 - 2022) and co-founder of Mohawk Innovative Technology. The company researches and develops green technology for integration into turbomachinery. Heshmat is a fellow in both the American Society of Mechanical Engineers (ASME), and the Society of Tribologists and Lubrication Engineers. In 2007, Heshmat received the Mayo D. Hersey Award, in recognition of his "contributions over a substantial period of time to the advancement of the science and engineering of tribology". In 2008, Heshmat received the International Award from the Society of Tribologists and Lubrication Engineers.

In 2025, Heshmat was elected to the National Academy of Engineering.

== Published works ==
- Heshmat, Hooshang (2010). Tribology of Interface Layers. CRC Press. ISBN 978-0-8247-5832-5.
