= Michael Lovell =

American engineer (1967–2024)

Michael R. Lovell
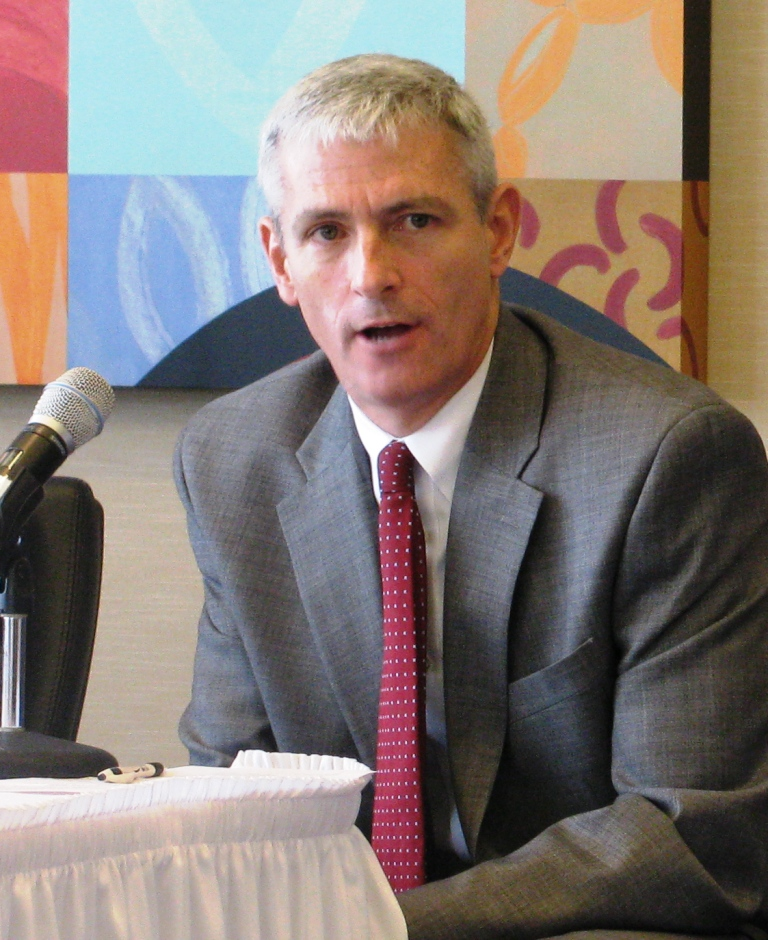
- Lovell in 2012

24th President of Marquette University
- In office September 19, 2014 – June 9, 2024
- Preceded by: Robert A. Wild (interim)
- Succeeded by: Kimo Ah Yun (acting)

8th Chancellor of the University of Wisconsin–Milwaukee
- In office 2011–2014
- Preceded by: Carlos E. Santiago
- Succeeded by: Mark Mone

Personal details
- Born: March 20, 1967
- Died: June 9, 2024 (aged 57) Rome, Italy
- Spouse: Amy Lovell
- Children: 4
- Education: University of Pittsburgh (BS, MS, PhD)

Michael R. Lovell (March 20, 1967 – June 9, 2024) was an American engineer and academic administrator, last serving as President of Marquette University. Lovell held the office from 2014 until his death in 2024. Lovell was the first President of Marquette University who was a layman.

== Education ==
Lovell received his Bachelor of Science, Master of Science, and Ph.D in mechanical engineering from University of Pittsburgh.

== Career ==
Lovell was the 8th chancellor for the University of Wisconsin–Milwaukee, having been named to that position by the UW System Board of Regents in April 2011. Lovell came to the University of Wisconsin–Milwaukee as its engineering school dean in 2008 and served as its interim chancellor after the departure of its former chancellor Carlos E. Santiago in 2010. He had previously been the Professor and Associate Dean for Research of the Swanson School of Engineering at the University of Pittsburgh.

Lovell published more than 100 articles in engineering journals, wrote a dozen book chapters, and co-authored a book, Tribology for Scientists and Engineers. As a researcher, Lovell was a lead or co-lead investigator for nearly $30 million in externally funded research grants from foundations, businesses and government agencies including the National Science Foundation, the Department of Energy, the Department of Defense and the Department of Education. His research led to several technological breakthroughs, and he held seven patents and 14 provisional patents. In 2013, Lovell was formally inducted into the National Academy of Inventors.

On July 6, 2014, it was announced that Lovell was named as President of Marquette University. Unlike previous Marquette University presidents, who were Catholic clergymen, Lovell was a lay president; the university itself is governed by the Catholic church's Society of Jesus. Lovell would be inaugurated on September 19, 2014.

== Death ==
On June 9, 2024, Lovell died of sarcoma while on a pilgrimage in Rome, Italy. He was 57.

== Awards ==
- NSF CAREER Award, Design Manufacturing and Industrial Innovation, 1997
- Outstanding International Publication on Bearings, FAG – Germany, 1997
- SME Outstanding Young Manufacturing Engineer Award, 1999
- ASME Burt L. Newkirk Award in Tribology, 2005
- Olympus Emerging Academic Innovator Award, 2006
- Fellow, American Society of Mechanical Engineers, 2008
- W. K. Whiteford Endowed Faculty Fellowship, 2000 – 2008
- State of Wisconsin Distinguished Professor, 2010–present
- Fellow of National Academy of Inventors, 2013

Academic offices
Preceded by Carlos E. Santiago	Chancellor of the University of Wisconsin–Milwaukee; 2010–2014	Succeeded by Mark Mone
Preceded by Robert A. Wild, S.J. (interim)	President of Marquette University; 2014–2024	Succeeded by Kimo Ah Yun
