= IEEE Medal for Engineering Excellence =

The IEEE Medal for Engineering Excellence was an award presented by the IEEE to recognize exceptional achievements in application engineering in the technical disciplines of the IEEE, for the benefit of the public and the engineering profession. The medal was awarded to an individual or a group of up to three people. It was established by the IEEE Board of Directors in 1986 and was last awarded in 2004.

Recipients of this medal received a gold medal, bronze replica, certificate and honorarium.

This award was discontinued in November 2009.

== Recipients ==
- 2004: Thomas E. Neal
- 2004: Richard L. Doughty
- 2004: H. Landis Floyd
- 2003: Ralph S. Gens
- 2002: No Award
- 2001: L. Bruce McClung
- 2000: Cyril G. Veinott
- 1999: Kiyoji Morii
- 1998: C. James Erickson
- 1997: John G. Anderson
- 1996: John R. Dunki-Jacobs
- 1995: Masasuke Morita
- 1994: Heiner Sussner
- 1993: Robert L. Hartman
- 1993: Richard W. Dixon
- 1993: Bernard C. DeLoach, Jr.
- 1992: Charles Elachi
- 1991: Alexander Feiner
- 1990: John Alvin (Jack) Pierce, the "Father of Omega"
- 1989: Walter A. Elmore
- 1988: Karl E. Martersteck, Jr.
