= IEEE Reynold B. Johnson Data Storage Device Technology Award =

Former annual award for data storage advancement

The IEEE Reynold B. Johnson Data Storage Device Technology Award was a Technical Field Award of the IEEE that was established by the IEEE Board of Directors in 2004 and was discontinued in 2011. The award was presented annually from 2006–2010 for outstanding contributions to the advancement of information storage, with an emphasis on technical contributions in computer data storage device technology. The award was named to honor Reynold B. Johnson.

The award was presented to three co-recipients in 2006, and to individuals from 2007–2010.

Recipients of this award received a bronze medal, certificate, and honorarium.

== Recipients ==
- 2010: David B. Bogy
- 2009: Kinam Kim
- 2008: Stanley H. Charap
- 2007: Mason L. Williams
- 2006: Eliyahou Harari
- 2006: Sanjay Mehrotra
- 2006: Jack Yuan
