= Frank Palmer Speare =

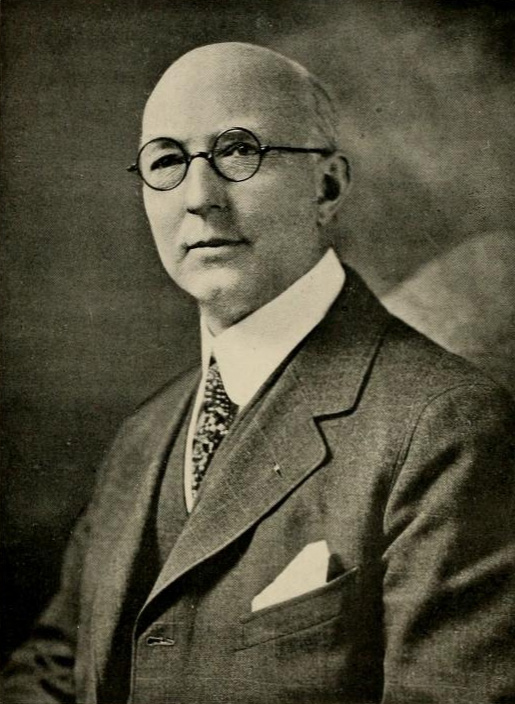
- Speare pictured in The Cauldron 1921, Northeastern yearbook

1st President of Northeastern University
- In office 1898–1940
- Preceded by: None
- Succeeded by: Carl Stephens Ell

Personal details
- Born: March 31, 1869 Dorchester, Massachusetts
- Died: May 28, 1954 (aged 84–85)
- Spouse(s): May Cushing Whiting, Katherine Vinton
- Children: Marjory Vinton Speare
- Parent(s): Charles Speare, Jeanette Palmer
- Education: Bridgewater State Teachers College, 1889

Frank Palmer Speare (1869 – May 28, 1954) was the first president of Northeastern University (formerly known as the Evening Institute for Younger Men until 1916), serving from 1898 to 1940. He began the evening program at the Boston YMCA that later became Northeastern. As founding president, he oversaw the launching of the university's evening law school, the now-defunct automobile school, the evening polytechnic schools, the school of commerce and finance, and the co-operative engineering school.

In addition to being an educator, he was also a sailor, farmer, and music enthusiast. He composed songs ("Silver Bay, a Song of Vacation Days") and other music (the "Northeastern March"), plays (Mystic Waters, or The Spirit of Winnipesaukee), and musicals.

== Notes ==
Academic offices
Preceded by None	President of Northeastern University; 1898– 1940	Succeeded by Carl Stephens Ell
