= Droplet cluster =

Self-assembled levitating monolayer of microdroplets

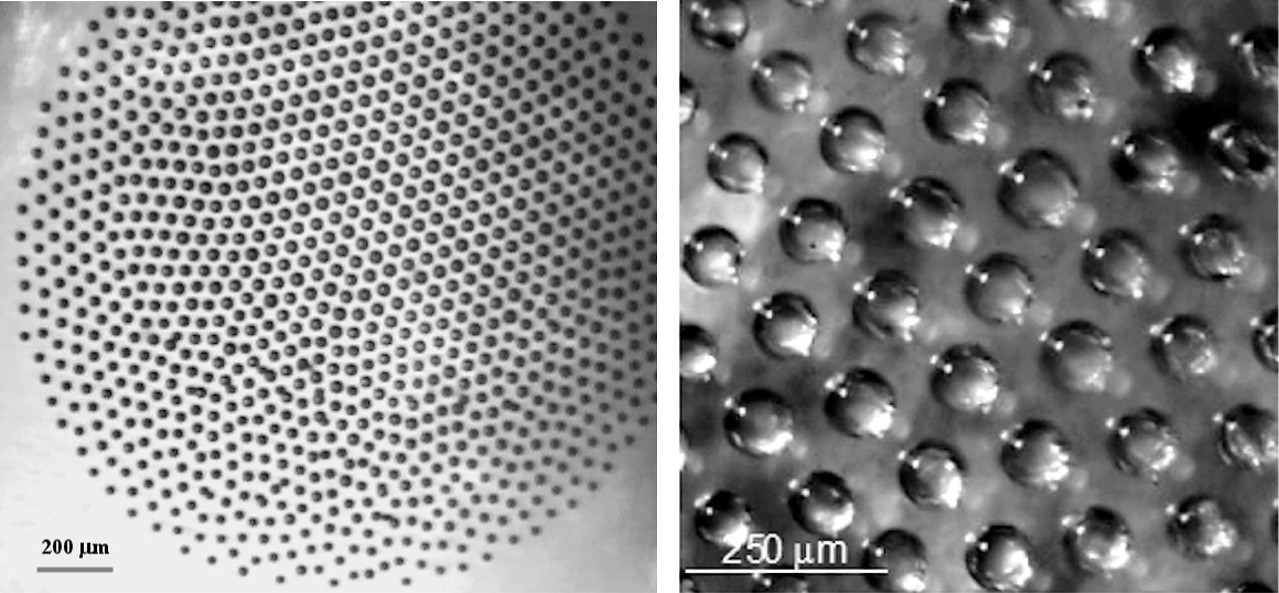
Self-assembled droplet clusters

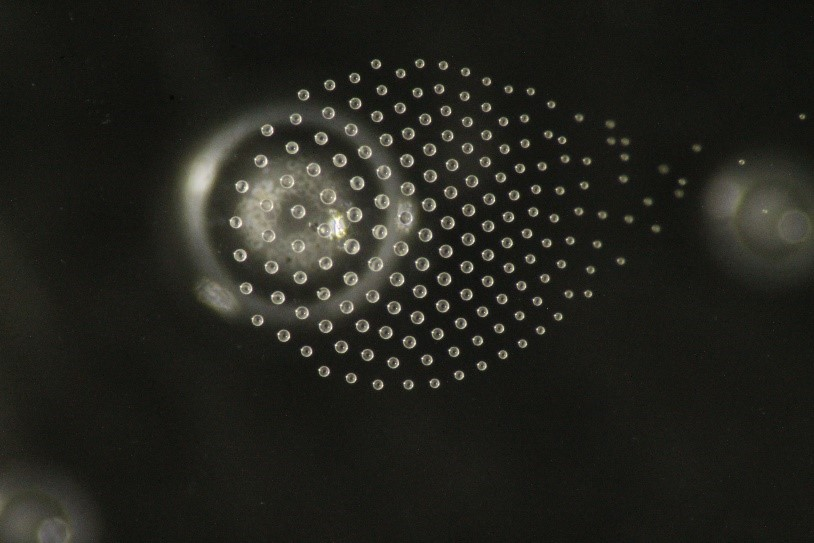
Self-assembled droplet cluster

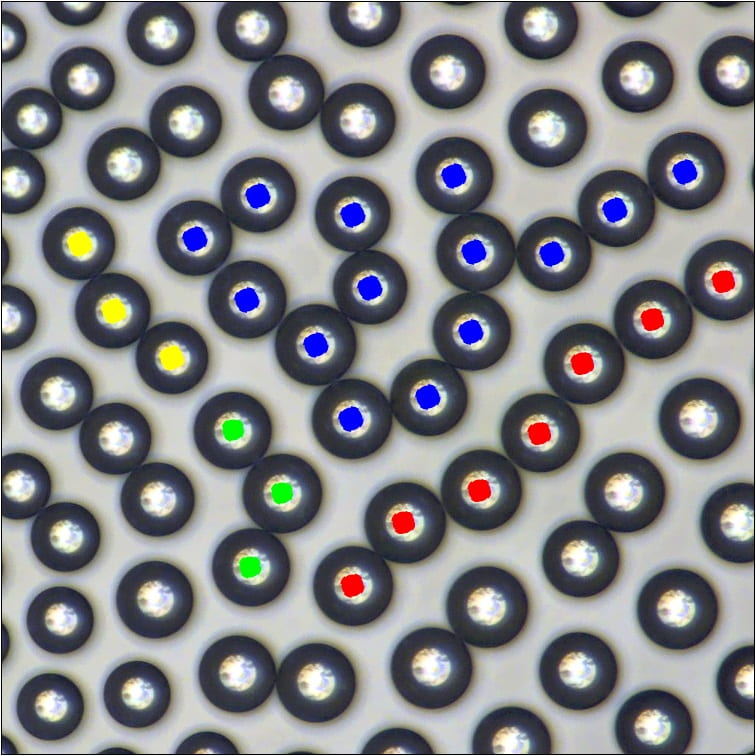
Chain droplet cluster

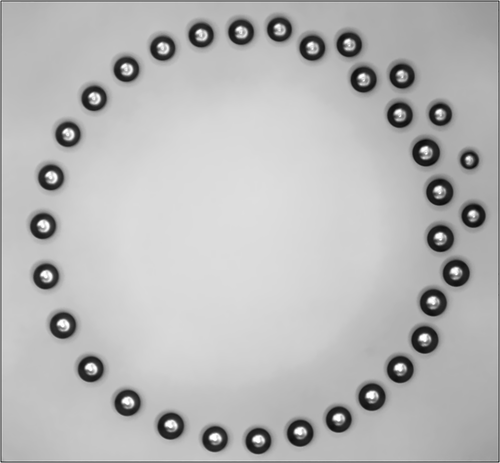
Ring droplet cluster

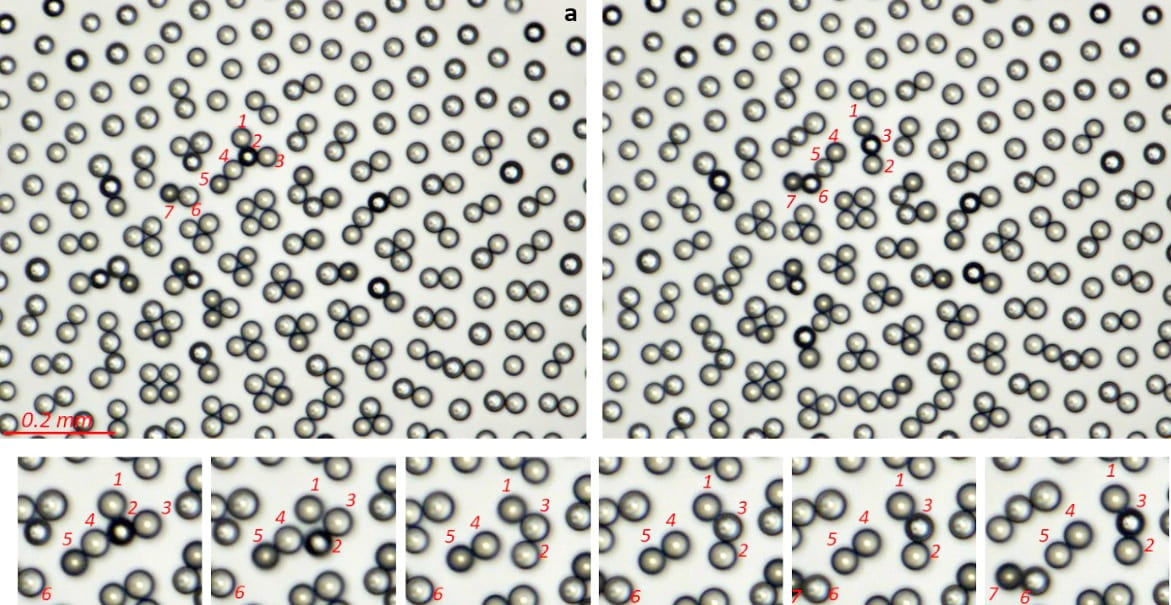
Hierarchical droplet cluster

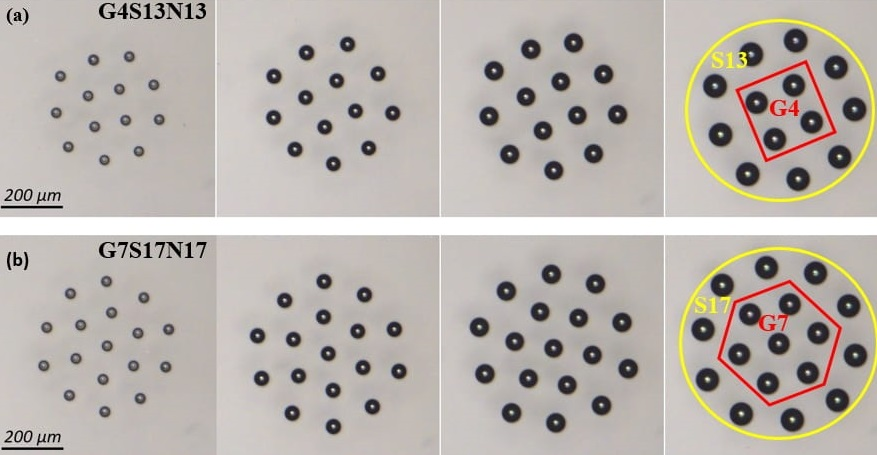
Small droplet clusters

Droplet cluster is a self-assembled levitating monolayer of microdroplets usually arranged into a hexagonally ordered structure over a locally heated thin (about 1 mm) layer of water. The droplet cluster is typologically similar to colloidal crystals. The phenomenon was observed for the first time in 2004, and it has been extensively studied after that.

Growing condensing droplets with a typical diameter of 0.01 mm – 0.2 mm levitate at an equilibrium height, where their weight is equilibrated by the drag force of the ascending air-vapor jet rising over the heated spot. At the same time, the droplets are dragged towards the center of the heated spot; however, they do not merge, forming an ordered hexagonal (densest packed) pattern due to an aerodynamic repulsive pressure force from gas flow between the droplets. The spot is usually heated by a laser beam or another source of heat to 60 °C – 95 °C, although the phenomenon was observed also at temperatures slightly above 20 °C. The height of levitation and the distance between the droplets are of the same order as their diameters.

Due to complex nature of aerodynamic forces between the microdroplets in an ascending jet, the droplets do not coalesce but form a close-packed hexagonal structure showing similarity with various classical and newly discovered objects, where self-organization is prominent, including water breath figures, colloid and dust crystals, foams, Rayleigh–Bénard cells, and to some extent, ice crystals. The droplets pack near the center of heated area where the temperature and the intensity of the ascending vapor jets are the highest. At the same time, there are repulsion forces of aerodynamic nature between the droplets. Consequently, the cluster packs itself in the densest packing shape (a hexagonal honeycomb structure) with a certain distance between the droplets dependent on the repulsion forces.

By controlling the temperature and temperature gradient one can control the number of droplets and their density and size. Using infrared irradiation, it is possible to suppress droplet growth and stabilize them for extended periods of time.

It has been suggested that the phenomenon, when combined with a spectrographic study of droplets content, can be used for rapid biochemical in situ analysis. Recent studies have shown that the cluster can exist at lower temperatures of about 20 °C, which makes it suitable for biochemical analysis of living objects.

Clusters with an arbitrary small number of droplets can be created. Unlike the clusters with a large number of droplets, small clusters cannot always form a hexagonally symmetric structure. Instead, they produce various more or less symmetric configurations depending on the number of droplets. Tracing individual droplets in small clusters is crucial for potential applications. The symmetry, orderliness, and stability of these configurations can be studied with such a measure of self-organization as the Voronoi entropy.

Since the most common hexagonal (honeycomb shaped) droplet cluster was observed for the first time in 2004, new types of types of levitating droplet clusters were discovered. In a chain droplet cluster, rotating droplets may be very close to each other but viscosity of the thin gas layer between the droplets prevents them from coalescing. There is a reversible structural transition from the ordered hexagonal cluster to the chain-like structure. A hierarchical cluster is built of small groups of droplets with interactions controlled by the electrostatic force are combined into larger structures controlled by aerodynamic forces. Droplet aggregates keep continuously restructuring The droplets permanently keep rearranging, so the phenomenon is similar to the "deterministic chaos" (the Lorenz attractor). In the absence of the surfactant suppressing the thermocapillary (TC) flow at the surface of the water layer, a ring-shaped cluster is formed. Small clusters may demonstrate 4-fold, 5-fold, and 7-fold symmetry which is absent from large drolet clusters and colloidal crystals. The symmetry properties of small cluster configurations are universal, i.e., they do not depend on the size of the droplets and details of the interactions between the droplets. It was hypothesized that the symmetries in small clusters may be related to the ADE classification or to the simply-laced Dynkin diagrams.

The phenomenon of the droplet cluster is different from the Leidenfrost effect because the latter occurs at much higher temperatures over a solid surface, while the droplet cluster forms at lower temperatures over a liquid surface. The phenomenon has also been observed with liquids other than water.

== See also ==
- Leidenfrost effect
- Rayleigh–Bénard convection
- Self assembly
