= Joseph E. Aoun =

Lebanese-born American linguist (born 1953)

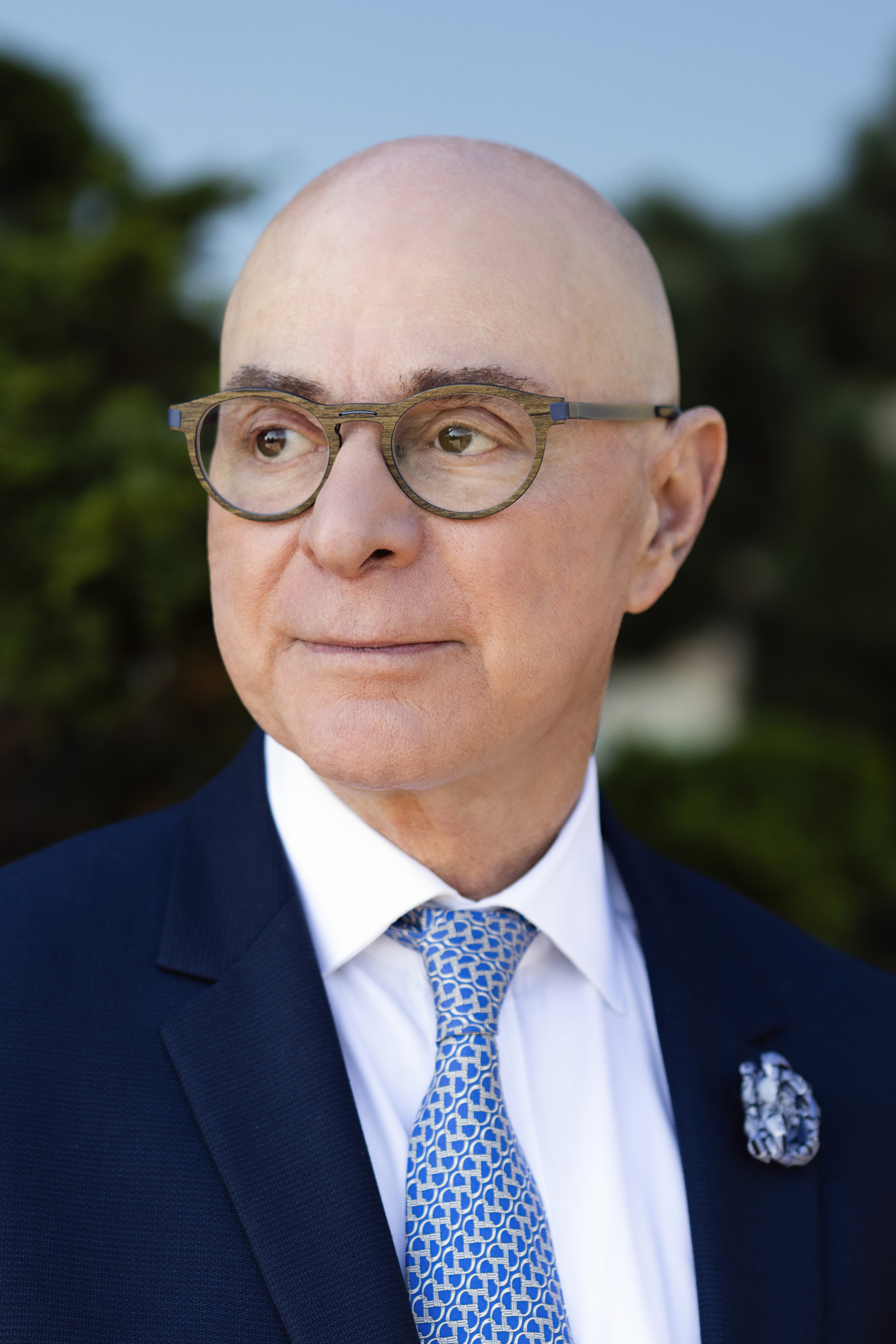
- Aoun in 2023

7th President of Northeastern University
- Incumbent
- Assumed office August 15, 2006
- Preceded by: Richard M. Freeland

Personal details
- Born: March 26, 1953 (age 73) Beirut, Lebanon
- Education: Saint Joseph University of Beirut (BA); Paris 8 University (MA); Massachusetts Institute of Technology (PhD)
- Scientific career
- Fields: Linguistics
- Workplaces: University of Southern California; Northeastern University
- Thesis: The formal nature of anaphoric relations (1982)
- Doctoral advisor: Noam Chomsky

Joseph Elias Aoun (born March 26, 1953) is a Lebanese-born American linguist who has been the 7th president of Northeastern University since 2006. He was the eighth highest-paid private college president in the United States during the 2022 fiscal year. He was previously a professor and a dean at the University of Southern California.

== Early life and education ==
Aoun was born in the Lebanese capital of Beirut. He received a master's degree in oriental languages and literature at the Université Saint-Joseph in Beirut in 1975, a diploma of Advanced Studies in General and Theoretical Linguistics at the University of Paris VIII in 1977, and a Ph.D. in linguistics from the Massachusetts Institute of Technology in 1981.

== Career ==
Aoun joined the University of Southern California (USC) in 1982 as a faculty member in linguistics. During his time at USC, he served as head of the academic Senate and eventually became a Dean. His success in fund-raising allowed for the hiring of multiple professors, the creation of named chairs backed by endowments, and the creation of two new sub-departments for the study of Armenian and Korean.

=== Northeastern University ===
Aoun was named the 7th president of Northeastern University in Boston on June 1, 2006. He assumed office on August 15, 2006.

In July 2007, Northeastern University purchased a 5-story townhouse for President Aoun at 34 Beacon Street for $8.9 million.

In November 2009, Aoun and the Board of Trustees oversaw the cancelling of the Northeastern Huskies football program. The program was 8–26 in its preceding three seasons and faced declining attendance and high costs if it wished to remain competitive in recruiting. The move, while controversial, was generally considered positive in retrospect; the funding it freed up allowed for the construction of the Interdisciplinary Science and Engineering Complex, which played more directly into Northeastern's strengths. Aoun later said he was overwhelmed with calls from other college presidents asking how he managed the feat without enraging alumni.

Aoun's 2018 salary was around $1.5–1.8 million dollars. In spring 2020, Aoun announced he would donate 20% of his annual salary (~$290,000) to new funds meant to support students facing economic hardship as a result of the COVID-19 pandemic and to support research programs related to the crisis. In 2021, his salary reached $2.7 million.

== Published book ==
Aoun's book Robot-Proof was published by the MIT Press on August 14, 2018. The book was published over a year after Aoun wrote a commentary on The Chronicle of Higher Education sharing its first part of the title. In the book, Aoun argues that to thrive alongside increasingly capable AI, education must shift from rote memorization to fostering what he calls "humanics": a blend of creativity, critical thinking, and empathy that enables students to invent, discover, and create value in ways machines cannot. He outlines a framework for continuous lifelong learning that equips people at every career stage with the adaptable skills needed to build fulfilling lives and meet society's evolving needs.

== Personal life ==
He is married to his wife Zeina; the couple has two sons, Adrian and Joseph Karim.

== Honors and awards ==
- Chevalier de La Légion d’honneur (Knight of the Legion of Honor): French Government, 2018
- Fellow of the American Academy of Arts and Sciences, 2010

== See also ==
- Generative linguistics
- David Pesetsky
- Hagit Borer
- Richard S. Kayne
- Howard Lasnik

Academic offices
Preceded by Richard M. Freeland	President of Northeastern University; 2006–present	Incumbent
