= George D. Behrakis =

Greek-American businessman

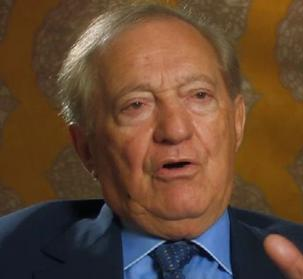
- Behrakis in 2013
- Born: 1 January 1934 (age 92); Lowell, Massachusetts
- Education: Northeastern University
- Occupations: Pharmaceutical entrepreneur, philanthropist
- Spouse: Margo Behrakis

George D. Behrakis (born January 1, 1934) is a Greek-American businessman, pharmaceutical entrepreneur, and philanthropist. He is best known for his donations to the Museum of Fine Arts in Boston, Massachusetts, and to Northeastern University's College of Health Sciences.

== Biography ==
Behrakis was born on January 1, 1934, in Lowell, MA, to Greek parents. He attended Lowell High School and later Northeastern University, where he earned a degree in pharmaceuticals.

He married his wife Margo Behrakis in 1961. They have four children and nine grandchildren.

== Pharmaceuticals ==
In 1959, Behrakis became a salesperson for McNeil Laboratories, which was later sold to Johnson and Johnson, where he and his team marketed Tylenol. He went on to start his own company, Dooner Laboratories, based in Haverhill, Massachusetts, in 1967. When Dooner was sold nine years later, he purchased Muro Pharmaceuticals, which was initially focused on skin and eye products, and later developed leading asthma and immunology products. In 1996, Muro was sold to German pharmaceutical group Degussa for $350 million. Behrakis remained on the board for two years, retiring in 1998.

== Philanthropy ==
After retiring from the pharmaceutical industry, Behrakis founded the Behrakis Foundation. He and his wife's philanthropy has focused on education, the arts, healthcare, and Hellenic religion and culture.

=== Northeastern Pharmacy School ===
In 2000, Behrakis and his wife made a substantial donation to Northeastern University, for the construction of the 84,000 square foot Behrakis Health and Sciences Center, one of the leading health sciences centers in the country. Construction of the new complex was completed in 2003. The building still stands today as one of the most advanced science centers in the country.

=== Museum of Fine Arts ===
In mid-2009, Behrakis and his wife made a $10 million donation to the Museum of Fine Arts (MFA) in Boston, to fund new exhibits on ancient Greek, Roman, and Egyptian civilizations. The donation resulted in the creation of the George D. and Margo Behrakis wing.

=== Boston Symphony Orchestra ===
Behrakis has been a long time benefactor of the Boston Symphony Orchestra, having donated over $7 million. He currently serves as a Life Trustee on the BSO Board of Trustees.

=== Anti-Smoking Campaign in Greece ===
In 2010, Behrakis made a $1.8 million donation to Harvard University fund research on smoking habits in Greece. This led to further funding and launch of a national anti-smoking campaign in Greece alongside Harvard, the Hellenic Cancer Society and Panagiotis Behrakis, MD, a well-respected pulmonary physician in Greece.

=== Leadership 100 ===
Behrakis has for many years been a member of Leadership 100, an organization which supports Hellenic religious and cultural causes. Behrakis served as chairman of the organization from 2006 to 2008. Two of his children, Drake and Stephanie, along with their spouses, are also active members of the organization.

=== Other organisations ===
Behrakis and his wife are also active members of many other organizations, including the National Hellenic Society and the Alpha Omega. Behrakis has also served on the board of Trustees at Tufts University, Northeastern University, Brigham and Women's Hospital and the Boys & Girls Club of Greater Lowell. In May 2012, Behrakis received an honorary degree from the Hellenic College in Boston, and in June was given another at Drexel University in Philadelphia. In September 2014, Behrakis, was presented with the Greek Heritage Award by The American College of Greece, recognizing his contribution to promoting Hellenism. In 2019, Mr Behrakis was honored by the Greek government with a stamp of his picture denoting his contribution to his anti-smoking campaign in the country.
