= Bharat Bhushan (academic) =

American engineer

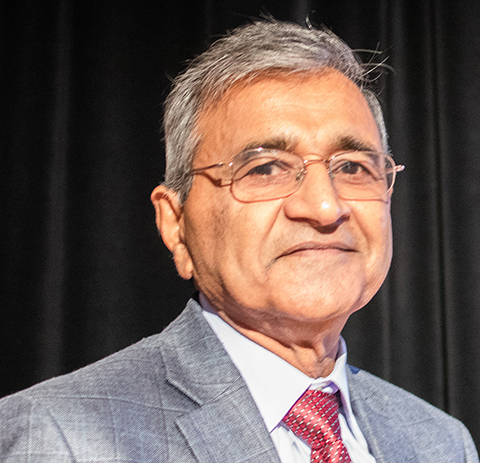

Bharat Bhushan is an American engineer. He is an Ohio Eminent Scholar and the Howard D. Winbigler Professor at Ohio State University.

== Education ==
Bhushan graduated with a BE in mechanical engineering from the Birla Institute of Technology and Science, Pilani in 1970, an MS in mechanical engineering from the Massachusetts Institute of Technology in 1971, and an MS in mechanics from the University of Colorado, Boulder (CU) in 1973. He received his PhD from CU in 1976. He also has an MBA in management from the Rensselaer Polytechnic Institute (1980).

In addition to five earned college degrees, he has also received five honorary doctorate degrees: in 1990 from the University of Trondheim; in 1996 from the Warsaw University of Technology; in 2000 from the Metal-Polymer Research Institute of the National Academy of Sciences of Belarus; in 2011 from the University of Kragujevac, and in 2019 from University of Tyumen, Russia.

== Research ==
Bhushan's research interests include nanotribology, nanomechanics, scanning probe microscopy, biotechnology, nanotechnology, biomimetics, science and public policy. He has authored or co-authored eleven books, more than 900 scientific papers, and holds more than 25 US and foreign patents. He is one of 1500 Google Scholar's ‘Highly Cited Researchers in All Fields’, with a ‘h index’ of 150, and one of Scopus 440 scientists for career-long citation impact across all fields worldwide. He is the Fourth Highly Cited Researcher in Mechanical Engineering and an ISI Highly Cited Researcher in Materials Science and in the Cross-field Category. Among various fellowships, in 1998 and 2007, he received the Alexander von Humboldt Research Prize for Senior Scientists, in 1999 and 2025, he received the Fulbright Senior Scholar Award, and in 2002 and 2007, he received Max Planck Foundation Research Award for Outstanding Foreign Scientists, He received the International Award from the Society of Tribologists and Lubrication Engineers. In 2015, he received the Institution of Chemical Engineers(UK) Global Award.

In 2004, he was honored with the Robert Henry Thurston Lecture Award by the American Society of Mechanical Engineers (ASME). In 2020, he received the Mayo D. Hersey Award from the ASME and the Tribology Gold Medal from the International Tribology Council. He is a member of European Academy of Sciences and Arts and International Academy of Engineering (Russia).
