= Asa S. Knowles =

American academic administrator (1909–1990)

Asa Smallidge Knowles

3rd President of Northeastern University
- In office 1959–1975
- Preceded by: Carl Stephens Ell
- Succeeded by: Kenneth G. Ryder

Personal details
- Born: January 15, 1909
- Died: August 11, 1990 (aged 81)
- Education: Bowdoin College, Boston University

Asa Smallidge Knowles (January 15, 1909 – August 11, 1990) was the ninth President of the University of Toledo and the third President of Northeastern University. A graduate of Thayer Academy, Knowles went on to earn his AB from Bowdoin College in 1930 and his MA from Boston University a few years later. Knowles began his teaching career at Northeastern, leaving for several years to attend several administrative positions at the University of Rhode Island, the Associated Colleges of Upper New York (1946–1948), Cornell University (1948–1951), and the University of Toledo. During his time as president of Northeastern, lasting from 1959 to 1975, he expanded the physical campus and changed Northeastern's image from a "technical school" to a more professional university. Significantly, during his tenure, enrollment at Northeastern was increased from 15,000 undergraduates all the way up to 35,000, and up to 50 academic programs were added.

Academic offices
Preceded by (Interim committee)	President of the University of Toledo; 1951–1958	Succeeded by William S. Carlson
Preceded by Carl Stephens Ell	3rd President of Northeastern University; 1959–1975	Succeeded by Kenneth G. Ryder
