= John A. Curry =

American academic administrator (1934–2023)

5th President of Northeastern University
- In office 1989–1996
- Preceded by: Kenneth G. Ryder
- Succeeded by: Richard M. Freeland

Personal details
- Born: May 12, 1934
- Died: April 21, 2023 (aged 88)
- Education: Northeastern University, Boston University

John A. Curry (May 12, 1934 – April 21, 2023) was an American academic administrator who was the President of Northeastern University from 1989 to 1996. Prior to serving as president, Curry was the university's Executive Vice President. Curry was the first alumnus to serve as Northeastern's president.

Curry grew up in the city of Lynn, Massachusetts, and graduated from Lynn English High School where he became a member of the Lynn English sport's hall of fame.

After receiving both his bachelor's and master's degree from Northeastern University, Curry went on to earn his Doctor of Education from Boston University. Curry was the husband of Marcia Curry, with whom he has three children; Robert Curry, Timothy Curry, and Susan Brown. The "John and Marcia Curry Student Center" was dedicated to President Curry following his retirement from Northeastern University.

During Curry's tenure, Northeastern University built a new science and engineering research center, a state-of-the-art classroom building, a recreation complex, and added new undergraduate and graduate programs. Curry also restructured the university and established a computer network on campus. In 1993, Curry hosted President Bill Clinton.

After his retirement, Curry published nine books. His first novel is titled "Loyalty" and the novel "Running in Lane One" was published in 2009. Curry resided in Saugus, Massachusetts, until his death on April 21, 2023, at the age of 88.

Academic offices
Preceded by Kenneth G. Ryder	5th President of Northeastern University; 1989–1996	Succeeded by Richard M. Freeland
