= Pertusaria luteola =

Scientific classification
- Domain: Eukaryota
- Kingdom: Fungi
- Division: Ascomycota
- Class: Lecanoromycetes
- Order: Pertusariales
- Family: Pertusariaceae
- Genus: Pertusaria
- Species: P. luteola

Binomial name
- Pertusaria luteola Boqueras (2003)

Species of lichen

Pertusaria luteola is a species of corticolous (bark-dwelling) crustose lichen in the family Pertusariaceae. Found in southwestern Europe, it was described as a new species in 2003.

== Taxonomy ==
Pertusaria luteola was first identified as a new species and described by the lichenologist Montserrat Boqueras from specimens collected in Spain. The type specimen (holotype) was collected from the bark of Quercus pyrenaica (Pyrenean oak) near Suarbol in the Province of León, within the autonomous community of Castile and León. This original reference specimen is preserved in the herbarium of the University of Barcelona (BCN) under the catalogue number 13140.

Taxonomically, P. luteola is distinguished from the related species P. alpina and P. werneriana by the presence of 2'-O-methylperlatolic acid, which is absent in P. alpina specimens. The species can be further differentiated from P. heterochroa by the presence of norstictic acid instead of stictic acid, a distinction that parallels the chemical difference between the saxicolous (rock-dwelling) species P. huneckiana and P. rupicola.

== Description ==
The thallus (main body) of Pertusaria luteola is smooth, thin, and typically appears grey-greenish to yellow-green or occasionally greyish with a yellowish tinge. It often develops cracks as it ages. The lichen lacks vegetative reproductive structures called soredia and isidia, which are present in some other lichen species.

Its reproductive structures (apothecia) are verruciform (wart-like), numerous, and dispersed across the thallus surface. These structures are not constricted at the base and measure 0.5–0.8 mm in diameter. The ostioles (pores through which spores are released) are punctiform (dot-like) and dark, measuring about 100–200 μm across, with typically one ostiole per verruca (wart-like structure). The epithecium (the upper layer of the reproductive structure) is dark, appearing green or blackish.

The spore-producing sacs (asci) each contain two spores arranged in a single row (uniseriate). These reproductive spores (ascospores) are ellipsoid in shape and measure 70–95 μm in length by 25–35 μm in width. A distinctive feature of these spores is the presence of transverse undulations on their inner walls. The spores have a double wall structure, with the outer wall appearing transversely striated when viewed under magnification.

When tested with chemical spot tests commonly used in lichen identification, the thallus is K+ (yellow to red, sometimes forming crystals), C+ (yellow), and KC+ (orange-reddish). The epithecium shows no reaction with potassium hydroxide (K−). Chemical analysis reveals the presence of thiophaninic acid and norstictic acid as the main lichen products.

== Habitat and distribution ==
Pertusaria luteola is a corticolous lichen, growing on the bark of trees. It has been documented on a variety of tree species including Quercus pyrenaica (Pyrenean oak), Betula celtiberica (a birch species), Crataegus monogyna (hawthorn), and various other Quercus (oak) species. The species appears to be particularly abundant in shaded deciduous forests. It has a known distribution primarily in the Iberian Peninsula (Spain and Portugal), with numerous documented specimens from various regions of Spain

== See also ==
- List of Pertusaria species
