= Pertusaria archeri =

Scientific classification
- Domain: Eukaryota
- Kingdom: Fungi
- Division: Ascomycota
- Class: Lecanoromycetes
- Order: Pertusariales
- Family: Pertusariaceae
- Genus: Pertusaria
- Species: P. archeri

Binomial name
- Pertusaria archeri Jariangpr. (2005)

Species of lichen

Pertusaria archeri is a rare species of corticolous (bark-dwelling), crustose lichen in the family Pertusariaceae. Found in Thailand, it was formally described as a new species in 2005 by Sureeporn Jariangprasert. The type specimen was collected by the author from Doi Khun Tan National Park (Lamphun-Lampang provinces) at an altitude of 1,010 m (3,310 ft), where it was found in an evergreen forest growing on the bark of Styrax. The species epithet honours Australian lichenologist Alan W. Archer, an authority of Pertusaria taxonomy. The main distinguishing characteristics of Pertusaria archeri are its two-spored asci, and the presence of depside methyl esters as lichen products.

== See also ==
- List of Pertusaria species
