= List of Pertusaria species =

Pertusaria is a large genus of crustose lichens in the family Pertusariaceae. A 2008 estimate placed 500 species in the genus.

== A ==
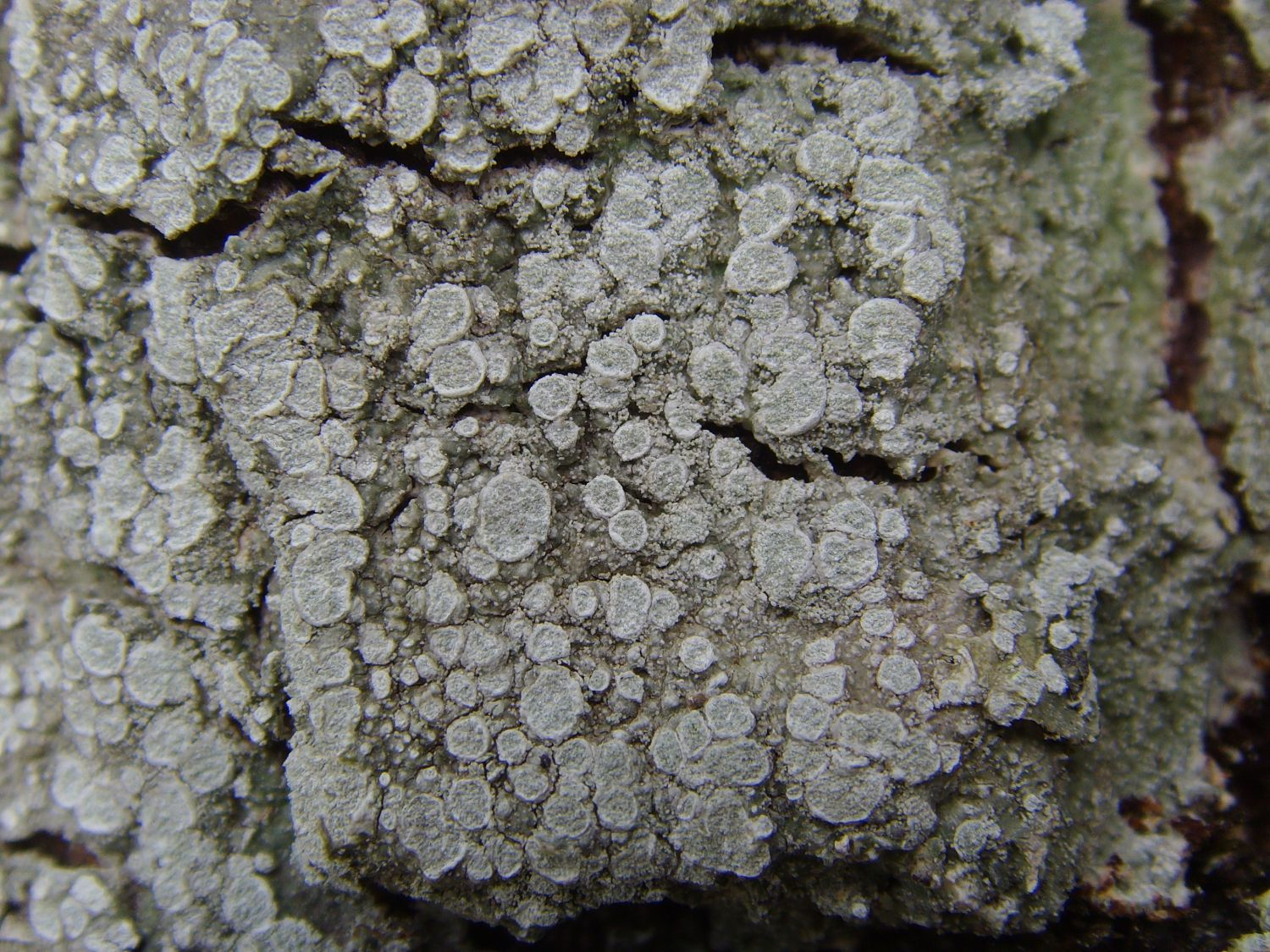
Pertusaria albescens

- Pertusaria aberrans Müll.Arg. (1893)
- Pertusaria aceroae Hern.-Padr., Etayo, Pérez-Vargas & Elix (2010) – Canary Islands
- Pertusaria albiglobosa Q.Ren (2013)
- Pertusaria albineoides Bungartz, A.W.Archer, Yánez-Ayabaca & Elix (2015)
- Pertusaria alboaspera A.W.Archer & Elix (1993)
- Pertusaria albula A.W.Archer & Elix (2017)
- Pertusaria alectoronica Elix & A.W.Archer (2007)
- Pertusaria allanii Zahlbr. (1941) – New Zealand
- Pertusaria allogibberosa A.W.Archer & Elix (1998) – Papua New Guinea
- Pertusaria alloisidiosa A.W.Archer & Elix (2020)
- Pertusaria allolutea A.W.Archer & Elix (2008)
- Pertusaria alloluteola A.W.Archer & Elix (2008) – Australia
- Pertusaria allomicrostoma Jariangpr. (2008) – Thailand
- Pertusaria allosorodes Elix & A.W.Archer (2013) – New Zealand
- Pertusaria allothwaitesii Jariangpr. & A.W.Archer (2004) – Thailand
- Pertusaria amarescens Nyl. (1874)
- Pertusaria ambigua A.W.Archer & Elix (2013) – Australia
- Pertusaria amblyogona Müll.Arg. (1895)
- Pertusaria amnicola Elix & A.W.Archer (1997)
- Pertusaria aphelospora (A.W.Archer) A.W.Archer & Elix (2016)
- Pertusaria appalachensis Lendemer, R.C.Harris & Elix (2008)
- Pertusaria amazonica Aptroot (2023) – Brazil
- Pertusaria angabangensis A.W.Archer & Elix (1998) – Papua New Guinea
- Pertusaria aptrootii A.W.Archer & Elix (1998) – Papua New Guinea
- Pertusaria aquilonia A.W.Archer & Elix (1997)
- Pertusaria archeri Jariangpr. (2005) – Thailand
- Pertusaria athrocarpa Elix & A.W.Archer (2015)
- Pertusaria atroguttata A.W.Archer & Elix (2014)
- Pertusaria atromaculata A.W.Archer & Elix (1992)
- Pertusaria atrospilota A.W.Archer & Elix (1998) – Papua New Guinea
- Pertusaria azulensis B.de Lesd. (1914)

== B ==
- Pertusaria bagoensis Elix & A.W.Archer (2010) – New South Wales
- Pertusaria balekensis A.W.Archer & Elix (1998) – Papua New Guinea
- Pertusaria barbatica A.W.Archer & Elix (1997)
- Pertusaria bogia A.W.Archer & Elix (1998) – Papua New Guinea
- Pertusaria bokluensis Jariangpr. (2005) – Thailand
- Pertusaria borealis Erichsen (1938)
- Pertusaria boweniana A.W.Archer & Elix (1997)
- Pertusaria brattiae Lumbsch & T.H.Nash (1999)
- Pertusaria bryontha (Ach.) Nyl. (1861)
- Pertusaria bundiensis A.W.Archer & Elix (1998) – Papua New Guinea

== C ==
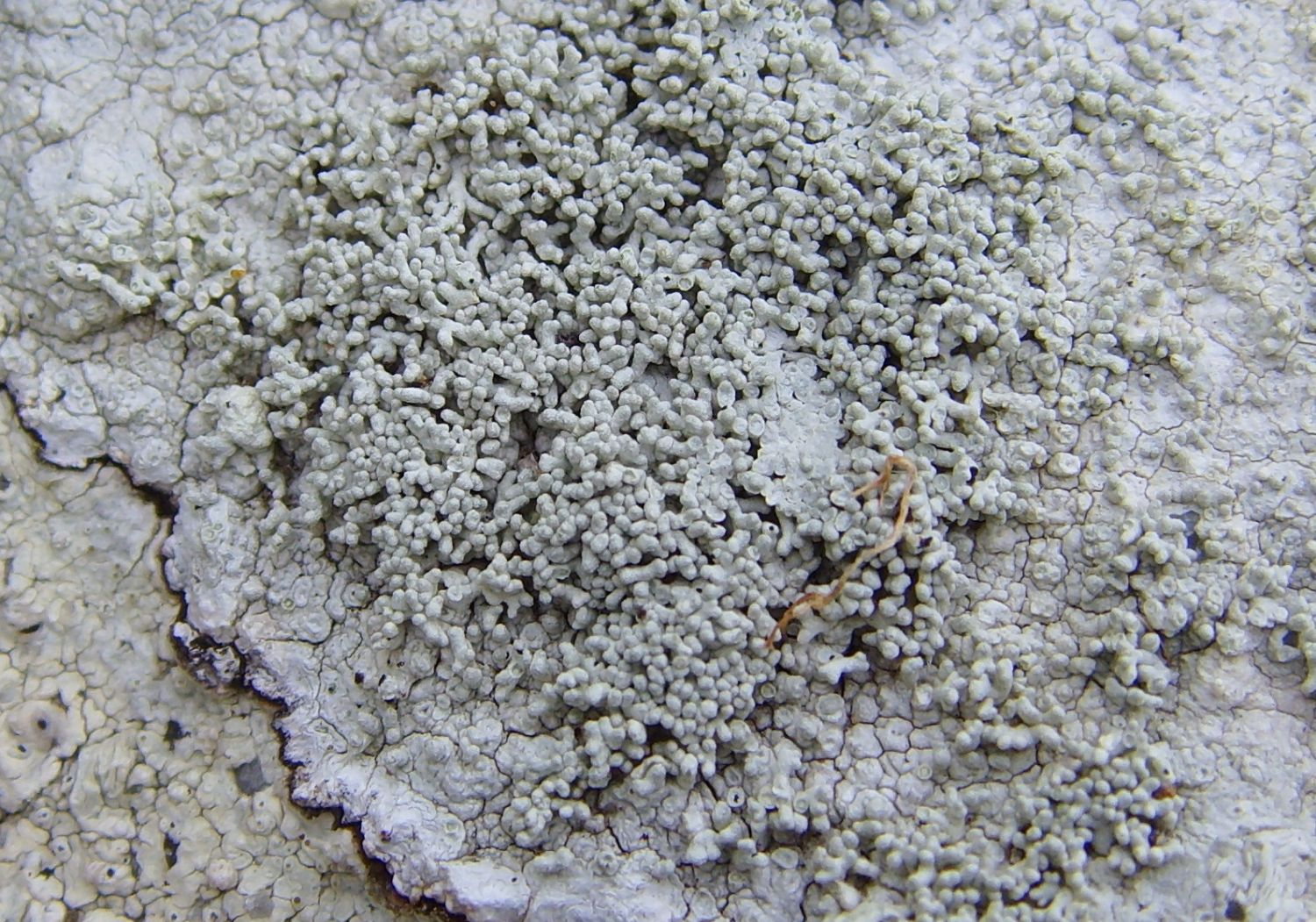
Pertusaria corallina

- Pertusaria calderae Hern.-Padr., Etayo, Pérez-Vargas & Elix (2010) – Canary Islands
- Pertusaria californica Dibben (1980)
- Pertusaria carneopallida (Nyl.) Anzi ex Nyl. (1868)
- Pertusaria cerebrinula Zahlbr. (1917)
- Pertusaria cerroazulensis Bungartz, A.W.Archer, Yánez-Ayabaca & Elix (2015)
- Pertusaria ceylonica Müll. Arg. (1884)
- Pertusaria chiodectonoides Bagl. ex A.Massal. (1855)
- Pertusaria cicatricosa Müll.Arg. (1882)
- Pertusaria cisalbescens Elix & A.W.Archer (2015)
- Pertusaria clercii Messuti & A.W.Archer (2007)
- Pertusaria coccodes (Ach.) Nyl. (1858)
- Pertusaria complanata A.W.Archer & Elix (1997)
- Pertusaria confluentica Jariangpr. & Elix (2008) – Australia and Thailand
- Pertusaria coniophorella Elix & A.W.Archer (2007)
- Pertusaria consanguinea Müll.Arg. (1884)
- Pertusaria consocians Dibben (1980)
- Pertusaria conspersa Messuti (2011)
- Pertusaria constricta Erichsen (1935)
- Pertusaria copelandii Vain. (1913)
- Pertusaria copiofructa A.W.Archer & Elix (2020)
- Pertusaria coronata (Ach.) Th.Fr. (1871)
- Pertusaria cryptostoma Müll.Arg. (1888)
- Pertusaria cyatheicola Elix (2006)

== D ==
- Pertusaria darwiniana Yánez-Ayabaca & Bungartz (2015)
- Pertusaria dayi A.W.Archer & Elix (2016)
- Pertusaria dealbescens Erichsen (1936)
- Pertusaria dehiscens Müll.Arg. (1884)
- Pertusaria dennistonensis Elix & A.W.Archer (2007)
- Pertusaria depressa (Fée) Mont. & Bosch (1856)
- Pertusaria dharugensis A.W.Archer & Elix (2017)
- Pertusaria dissita Elix & A.W.Archer (1995)
- Pertusaria doradorensis Elix & A.W.Archer (1997)

== E ==
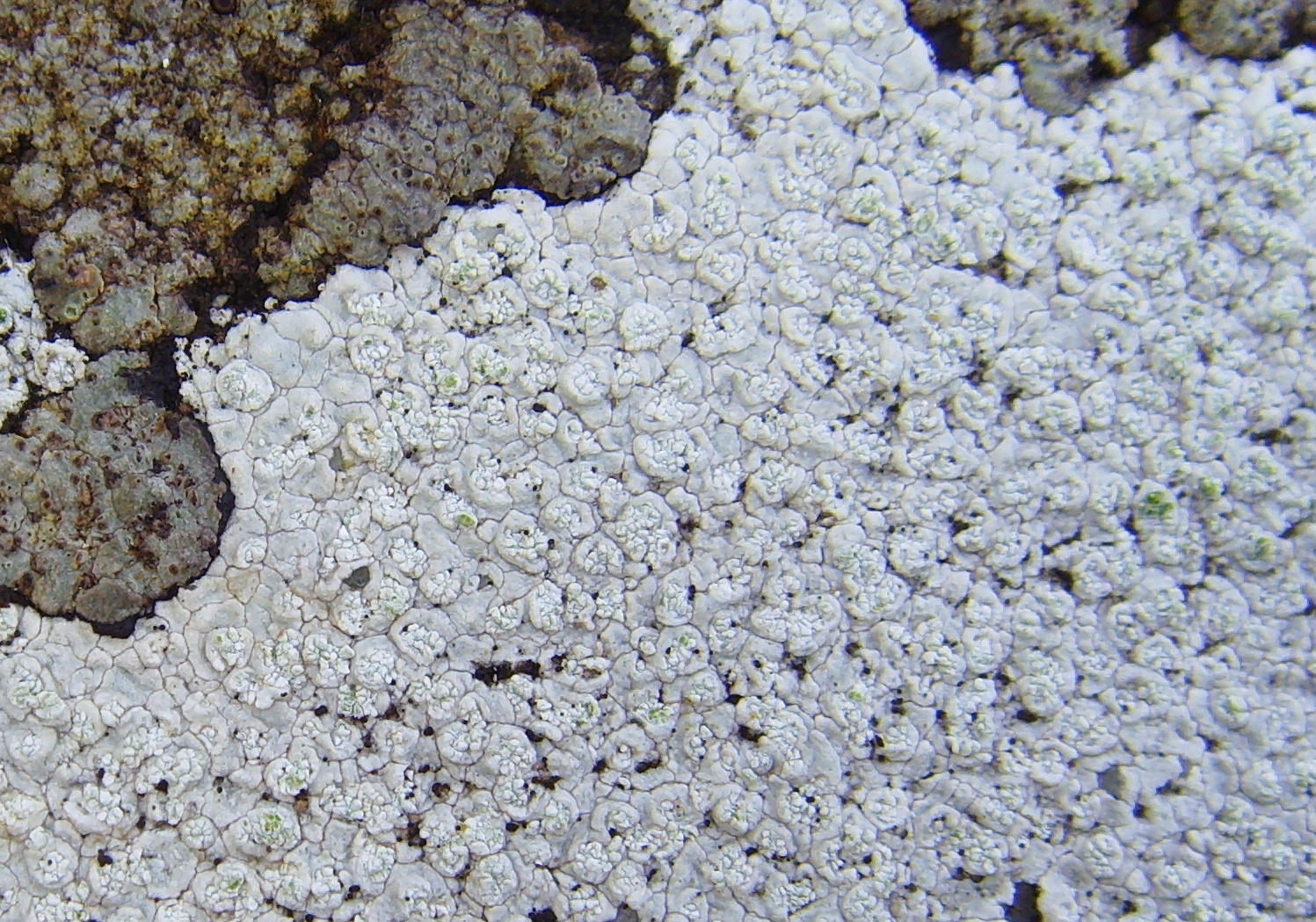
Pertusaria excludens

- Pertusaria elixii Jariangpr. (2005) – Thailand
- Pertusaria elizabethae A.W.Archer & Elix (2014) – Brazil
- Pertusaria elliptica Müll.Arg. (1895)
- Pertusaria endoxantha Vain. (1898)
- Pertusaria epacrospora A.W.Archer (1991)
- Pertusaria epitheciifera Sipman (1993)
- Pertusaria errinundrensis A.W.Archer (1991)
- Pertusaria etayoi Pérez-Vargas & Hern.-Padr. (2012)
- Pertusaria ewersii A.W.Archer & Elix (1997)

== F ==
- Pertusaria ferax (Müll.Arg.) A.W.Archer & Elix (2014)
- Pertusaria fernandeziana Messuti (2005) – Chile
- Pertusaria flavicans Lamy (1880)
- Pertusaria flavicunda Tuck. (1877)
- Pertusaria flavida (DC.) J.R.Laundon (1963)
- Pertusaria flavocorallina Coppins & Muhr (1992)
- Pertusaria flavoexpansa Kantvilas & Elix (2008)
- Pertusaria flavoisidiata A.W.Archer & Elix (1993)
- Pertusaria flavopunctata A.W.Archer & Elix (2008) – Australia
- Pertusaria flindersiana Kantvilas & Elix (2008)
- Pertusaria follmanniana A.W.Archer & Elix (1995)
- Pertusaria fosseyae A.W.Archer, Elix, Eb. Fisch., Killmann & Sérus. (2009) – Democratic Republic of Congo

== G ==
- Pertusaria gadgarrensis A.W.Archer & Elix (2017)
- Pertusaria galapagoensis Elix, Yánez-Ayabaca, A.W.Archer & Bungartz (2015)
- Pertusaria georgeana A.W.Archer & Elix (1997)
- Pertusaria glabra A.W.Archer & Elix (2016)
- Pertusaria glaucomela (Tuck.) Nyl. (1887)
- Pertusaria glebulosa A.W.Archer & Elix (2017)
- Pertusaria globospora A.W.Archer (1992)
- Pertusaria glomelliferica Elix & A.W.Archer (2008) – Australia
- Pertusaria glomerata (Ach.) Schaer. (1826)
- Pertusaria glomulifera Leight. (1871)
- Pertusaria granulata (Eschw.) Flot. (1843)
- Pertusaria grassiae Messuti & A.W.Archer (2004) – Argentina
- Pertusaria guineabissauensis Paz-Berm., A.W.Archer & Elix (2019)
- Pertusaria gundermanica A.W.Archer & Elix (1997)
- Pertusaria gymnospora Kantvilas (1990)

== H ==
- Pertusaria hadrocarpa Zahlbr. (1924)
- Pertusaria hartmannii Müll.Arg. (1882)
- Pertusaria havaiiensis Erichsen (1936)
- Pertusaria heinarii A.W.Archer & Elix (2016)
- Pertusaria hermaka A.W.Archer (1991)
- Pertusaria hiatensis A.W.Archer & Elix (2017)
- Pertusaria homilocarpa A.W.Archer & Elix (2014)
- Pertusaria hossei (Räsänen) A.W.Archer & Osorio (2014)
- Pertusaria huneckiana Feige & Lumbsch (1993)
- Pertusaria huanicola Messuti & A.W.Archer (2006) – Argentina
- Pertusaria humilis Elix & A.W.Archer (2013) – Australia
- Pertusaria hutchinsiae (Borrer) Leight. (1851)
- Pertusaria hylocola Jariangpr. & A.W. Archer (2003)
- Pertusaria hymenea (Ach.) Schaer. (1836)
- Pertusaria hypoprotocetrarica A.W.Archer & Elix (1998) – Papua New Guinea
- Pertusaria hypostictica Jariangpr. (2005) – Thailand
- Pertusaria hypoxantha Malme (1936)

== I ==
- Pertusaria inconspicua A.W.Archer & Elix (1998) – Papua New Guinea
- Pertusaria injuneana A.W.Archer & Elix (1997)
- Pertusaria inopinata Erichsen (1936)
- Pertusaria insularicola A.W.Archer & Elix (2019)
- Pertusaria inthanonensis Jariangpr. (2005) – Thailand
- Pertusaria irregularis Müll.Arg. (1895)
- Pertusaria isidiosa A.W.Archer (1991)
- Pertusaria islandica Bratt, Lumbsch & I.Schmitt (2006)

== J ==
- Pertusaria jogyeensis J.S.Park & Hur (2017)
- Pertusaria jurana Erichsen (1936)

== K ==
- Pertusaria kansriae Jariangpr. (2005) – Thailand
- Pertusaria karkarensis A.W.Archer & Elix (1998) – Papua New Guinea
- Pertusaria kinigiensis A.W.Archer, Elix, Eb.Fisch., Killmann & Sérus. (2009) – Rwanda
- Pertusaria knightiana Müll.Arg. (1892)
- Pertusaria krabiensis Jariangpr. (2005) – Thailand
- Pertusaria krogiae A.W.Archer, Elix, Eb.Fisch., Killmann & Sérus. (2009) – Rwanda

== L ==
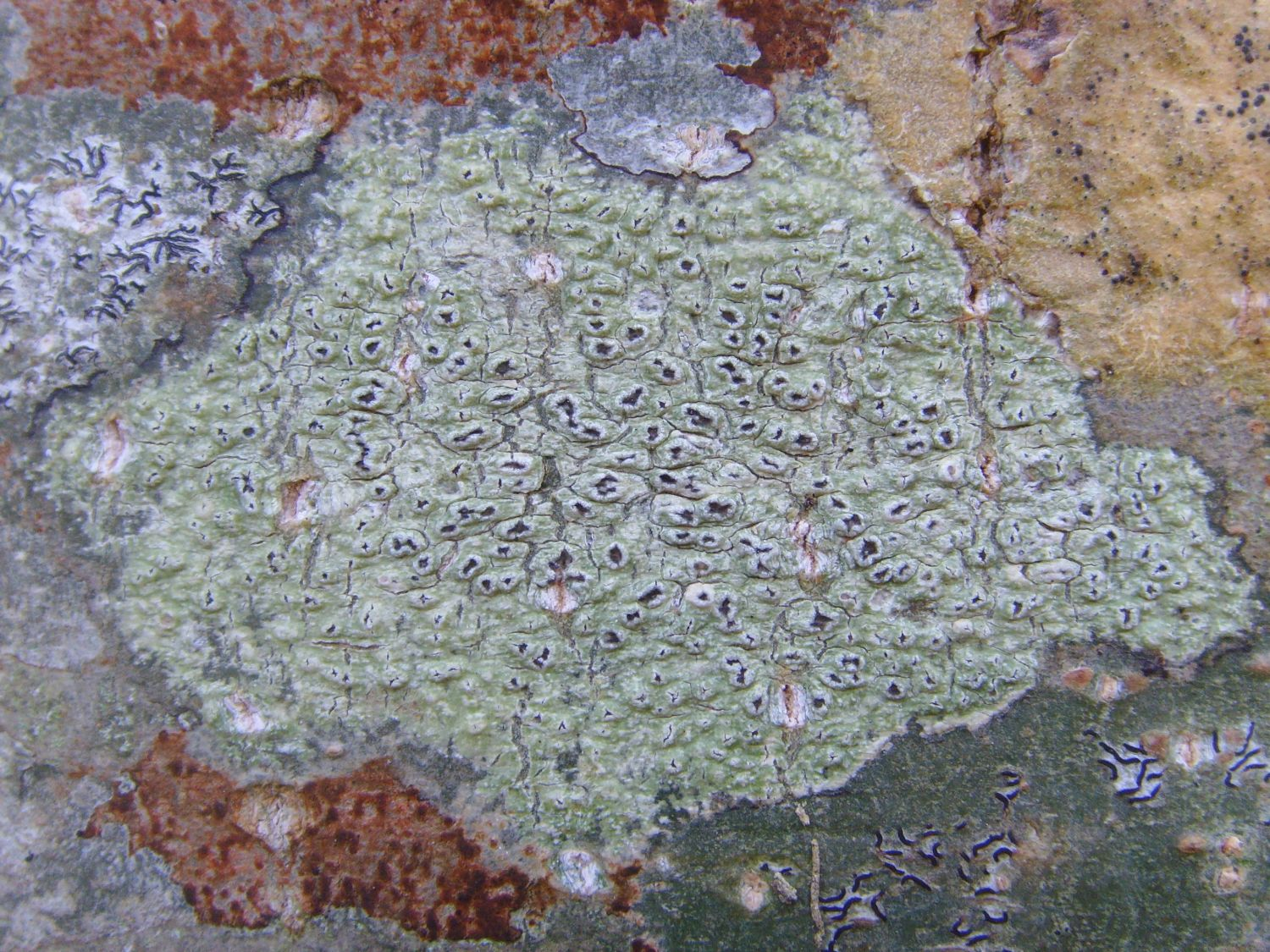
Pertusaria leioplaca

- Pertusaria labuensis A.W.Archer & Elix (2009)
- Pertusaria lacerans Müll.Arg. (1884)
- Pertusaria lactescens Mudd (1861)
- Pertusaria laeana A.W.Archer & Elix 1998) – Papua New Guinea
- Pertusaria lambinonii A.W.Archer, Elix, Eb.Fisch., Killmann & Sérus. (2009) – Democratic Republic of Congo
- Pertusaria lansangensis Jariangpr. & A.W. Archer (2004) – Thailand
- Pertusaria lavata Müll.Arg. (1884)
- Pertusaria lecanina Tuck. 1872
- Pertusaria leiocarpella Müll.Arg. (1895)
- Pertusaria leioplaca (Ach.) DC. (1815)
- Pertusaria leioplacella Nyl. (1868)
- Pertusaria leptocarpa Anzi (1860)
- Pertusaria lueckingii Bungartz, A.W.Archer & Elix (2015) – Galápagos Islands
- Pertusaria leucophaea Elix & A.W.Archer (2010) – Australia
- Pertusaria leucoplaca Müll.Arg. (1884)
- Pertusaria leucostigma Müll.Arg. (1884)
- Pertusaria leucostomoides Zahlbr. (1927)
- Pertusaria leucothelia Müll.Arg. (1895)
- Pertusaria lichexanthofarinosa Aptroot & Cáceres (2018) – Brazil
- Pertusaria lichexanthoimmersa Aptroot & Cáceres (2018) – Brazil
- Pertusaria lichexanthoverrucosa Aptroot & Cáceres (2018) – Brazil
- Pertusaria limbata Vain. (1890)
- Pertusaria litchiicola Jariangpr. & A.W.Archer (2003)
- Pertusaria loeiensis Jariangpr. (2005) – Thailand
- Pertusaria lophocarpa Körb. (1862)
- Pertusaria lordhowensis A.W.Archer & Elix (1994)
- Pertusaria lueckingii Bungartz, A.W.Archer & Elix (2015)
- Pertusaria lumbschii A.W.Archer & Elix (2017)
- Pertusaria luteola Boqueras (2003)

== M ==
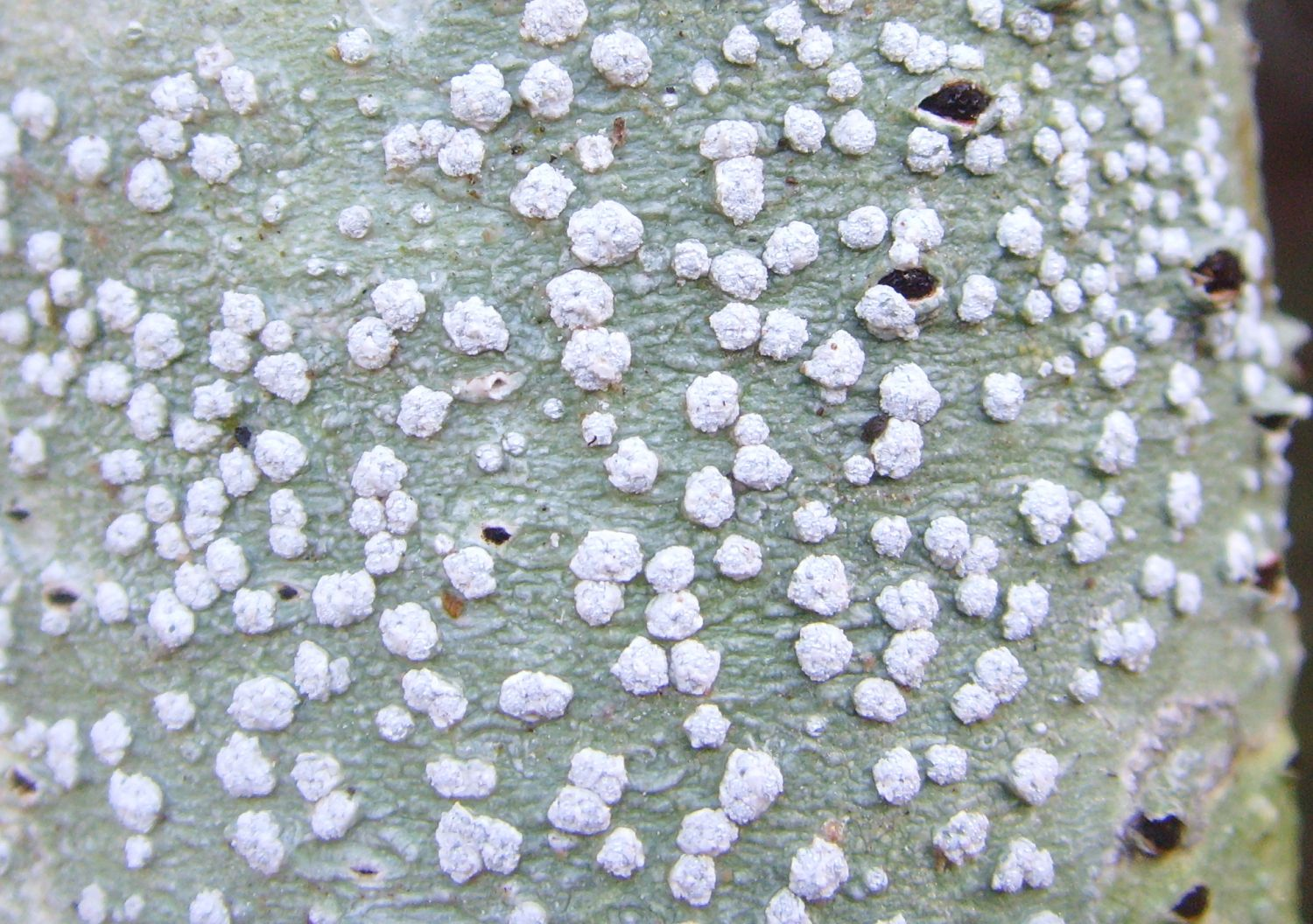
Pertusaria multipuncta

- Pertusaria macra Müll.Arg. (1895)
- Pertusaria macroides A.W.Archer & Elix (2020)
- Pertusaria maculiformis D.D.Awasthi (2000)
- Pertusaria malabara A.W.Archer & Elix (1994)
- Pertusaria malmei Elix & A.W.Archer (2009)
- Pertusaria malvinae Messuti & A.W.Archer (1999)
- Pertusaria manamensis A.W.Archer & Elix (1998) – Papua New Guinea
- Pertusaria mankiensis A.W.Archer & Elix (2009)
- Pertusaria marcellii A.W.Archer & Elix (2014)
- Pertusaria mariae B.de Lesd. (1914)
- Pertusaria maritima A.W.Archer & Elix (1994)
- Pertusaria mattogrossensis Malme (1936)
- Pertusaria mccroryae Björk, Goward & T.Sprib. (2010)
- Pertusaria medullamarilla Yánez-Ayabaca, Bungartz, A.W.Archer & Elix (2015)
- Pertusaria megacarpa A.W.Archer & Elix (2014)
- Pertusaria meeana A.W.Archer & Elix (1997)
- Pertusaria melaleucoides Müll.Arg. (1884)
- Pertusaria melanospora Nyl. (1855)
- Pertusaria melanostoma Kremp. (1878)
- Pertusaria mesotropa Müll.Arg. (1884)
- Pertusaria methylstenosporica] Jariangpr. (2006) – Thailand
- Pertusaria microstoma Müll.Arg. (1882)
- Pertusaria miscella A.W.Archer (1991)
- Pertusaria minispora A.W.Archer & Elix (2009)
- Pertusaria modesta Müll.Arg. (1884)
- Pertusaria montoensis A.W.Archer & Elix (2016)
- Pertusaria montana Q.Ren (2016) – China
- Pertusaria montpittensis] A.W.Archer (1992)
- Pertusaria moreliensis B.de Lesd. (1914)
- Pertusaria myola A.W.Archer & Elix (1998) – Papua New Guinea

== N ==
- Pertusaria naduriensis A.W.Archer & Elix (1998) – Papua New Guinea
- Pertusaria nahaeoensis Jariangpr. & A.W.Archer (2002) – Thailand
- Pertusaria nanensis Jariangpr. & A.W.Archer (2004) – Thailand
- Pertusaria nebulosa A.W.Archer (1992)
- Pertusaria neoknightiana Jariangpr. (2006) – Thailand
- Pertusaria neolecanina Lumbsch & T.H.Nash (1999)
- Pertusaria neotriconica I.M.Lamb (1954)
- Pertusaria nerrigensis A.W.Archer & Elix (1997)
- Pertusaria norfolkensis A.W.Archer (1992)
- Pertusaria novae-guineae A.W.Archer & Elix (1998) – Papua New Guinea
- Pertusaria novae-hollandiae A.W.Archer (1992)

== O ==
- Pertusaria oblongata Müll.Arg. (1884)
- Pertusaria occidentalis Bratt, Lumbsch & I.Schmitt (2006)
- Pertusaria ochrodigitula A.W.Archer & Elix (2017)
- Pertusaria oculae-ranae Øvstedal & Søchting (2004)
- Pertusaria oculata (Dicks.) Th.Fr. (1871)
- Pertusaria omkoiensis Jariangpr. & A.W.Archer (2002) – Thailand
- Pertusaria orarensis A.W.Archer & Elix (1997)
- Pertusaria orientalis Jariangpr. (2006) – Thailand

== P ==
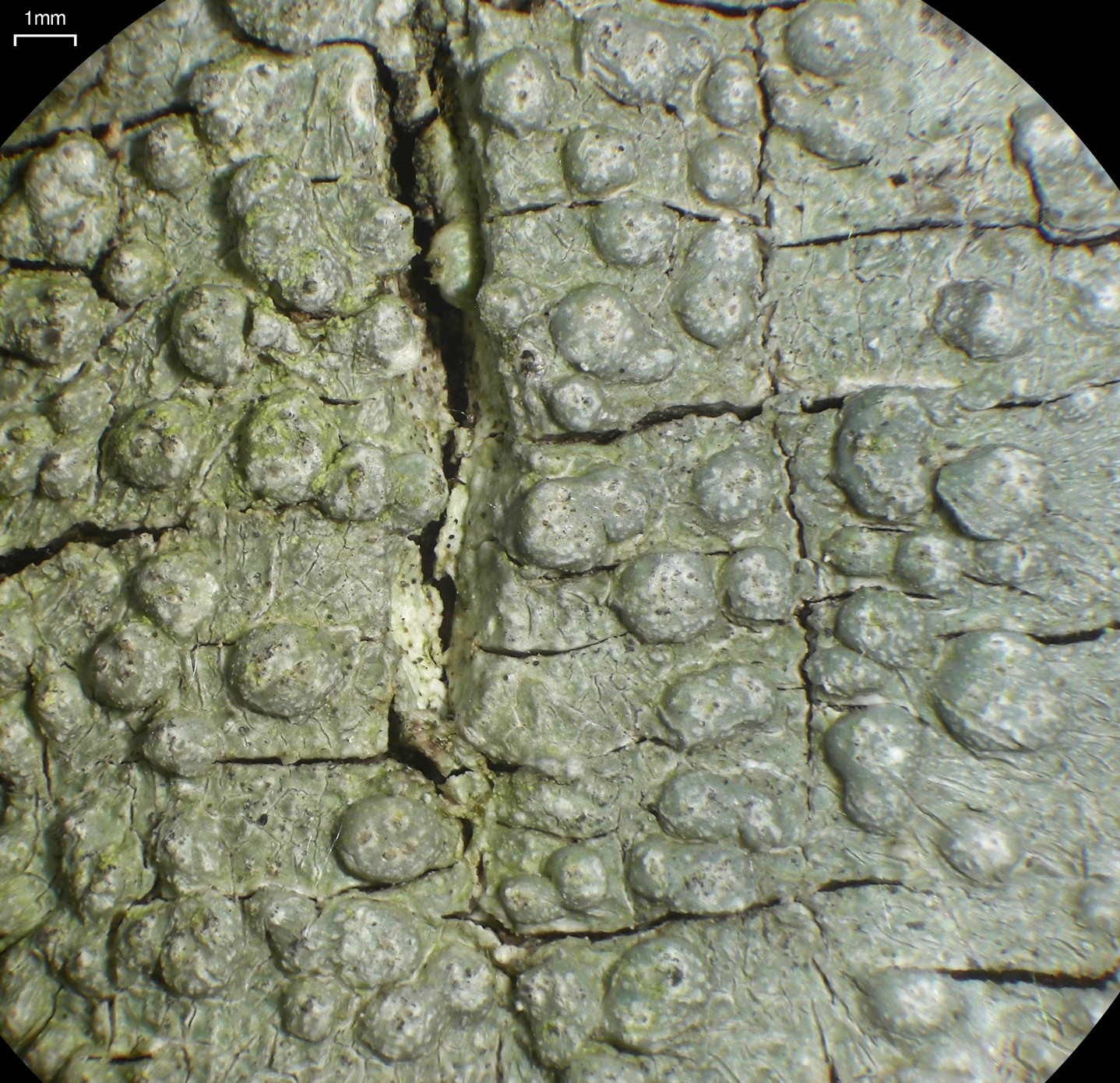
Pertusaria paratuberculifera

- Pertusaria pachythallina (Räsänen) Messuti (2006)
- Pertusaria pallida A.W.Archer & Elix (1997)
- Pertusaria palumaensis Elix & A.W.Archer (2009)
- Pertusaria papillulata (Ach.) Tuck. (1848)
- Pertusaria papuana A.W.Archer & Elix (1998) – Papua New Guinea
- Pertusaria paradoxica A.W.Archer & Elix (1992)
- Pertusaria parameeana Jariangpr. (2006) – Thailand
- Pertusaria paramerae A.Crespo & Vězda (1985)
- Pertusaria parapycnothelia Q.Ren & Z.T.Zhao (2009)
- Pertusaria paraqilianensis Z.S.Sun & Z.T.Zhao (2009) – Qinghai (China)
- Pertusaria paratropa Müll.Arg. (1895)
- Pertusaria paratropica Q.Ren (2014)
- Pertusaria paratuberculifera Dibben (1980)
- Pertusaria parmatica A.W.Archer & Elix (1998) – Papua New Guinea
- Pertusaria patellifera A.W.Archer (1991)
- Pertusaria perrimosa Nyl. (1865)
- Pertusaria perthwaitesii A.W.Archer & Elix (1998) – Papua New Guinea
- Pertusaria pertractata Stirt. (1876)
- Pertusaria pertusa (L.) Tuck. (1845)
- Pertusaria pertusella Müll.Arg. (1884)
- Pertusaria petrophyes C.Knight (1882)
- Pertusaria phlyctaenula Nyl. (1855)
- Pertusaria phulhuangensis Jariangpr. (2006) – Thailand
- Pertusaria phusoidaoensis Jariangpr. (2008) – Thailand
- Pertusaria pilosula A.W.Archer & Elix (1997)
- Pertusaria pinnaculata A.W.Archer & Elix (2017)
- Pertusaria placocarpa A.W.Archer & Elix (2017)
- Pertusaria planaica A.W.Archer & Elix (1992)
- Pertusaria platycarpa Jariangpr. (2006) – Thailand
- Pertusaria pluripuncta Nyl. (1883)
- Pertusaria polythecia (Taylor) Erichsen (1936)
- Pertusaria porinella Nyl. (1863)
- Pertusaria praecipua A.W.Archer & Elix (1998) – Papua New Guinea
- Pertusaria praetermissa A.W.Archer & Elix (1997)
- Pertusaria pseudococcodes Müll.Arg. (1884)
- Pertusaria pseudocorallina (Lilj.) Arnold (1887)
- Pertusaria pseudoculata Øvstedal (2001)
- Pertusaria pseudomelanospora V.Wirth & Elix (2005)
- Pertusaria pseudoparotica Sipman (2002)
- Pertusaria pseudothwaitesii A.W.Archer & Elix (1997)
- Pertusaria puffina A.W.Archer & Elix (1994)
- Pertusaria pupillaris (Nyl.) Th.Fr. (1871)
- Pertusaria pustulata (Ach.) Duby (1830)
- Pertusaria puttyensis A.W.Archer & Elix (2017)
- Pertusaria pycnothelia Nyl. (1868)

== Q ==
- Pertusaria qilianensis Q.Ren & Z.T.Zhao (2009) – Qinghai (China)
- Pertusaria qinbaensis Q.Ren (2014)
- Pertusaria quadraginta A.W.Archer & Elix (2017)
- Pertusaria queenslandica Elix & A.W.Archer (2013) – Australia

== R ==
- Pertusaria ramuensis A.W.Archer & Elix (1998) – Papua New Guinea
- Pertusaria rarotongensis A.W.Archer & Elix (2014)
- Pertusaria remota A.W.Archer (1991)
- Pertusaria rhexostoma Nyl. (1891)
- Pertusaria rhodostoma Nyl. (1863)
- Pertusaria rigida Müll.Arg. (1892)
- Pertusaria roccellica A.W.Archer & Elix (2019)
- Pertusaria rogersii A.W.Archer & Elix (2014)
- Pertusaria roseola A.W.Archer & Elix (2008) – Australia
- Pertusaria rubefacta Erichsen (1934)
- Pertusaria rupicola (Sommerf.) Harm. (1898)

== S ==
- Pertusaria salacinifera Messuti & A.W. Archer (1999) – Falkland Islands
- Pertusaria salax Brusse (1986)
- Pertusaria salazinica A.W.Archer & Elix (2017) – Australia
- Pertusaria salebrosa A.W.Archer & Elix (1997) – Australia
- Pertusaria saltuensis A.W.Archer & Elix (1992)
- Pertusaria saxatilis A.W.Archer & Elix (2014) – Brazil
- Pertusaria saximontana Wetmore (1968)
- Pertusaria scabrida A.W.Archer & Elix (2017)
- Pertusaria sejilaensis Q.Ren (2014) – China
- Pertusaria siamensis Jariangpr. (2005) – Thailand
- Pertusaria simoneana A.W.Archer & Elix (2009)
- Pertusaria sipmanii A.W.Archer & Elix (1998) – Papua New Guinea
- Pertusaria sommerfeltii (Sommerf.) Flörke (1831)
- Pertusaria southlandica A.Knight, Elix & A.W.Archer (2011)
- Pertusaria spegazzinii Müll.Arg. (1889)
- Pertusaria stellata Fryday (2008)
- Pertusaria stenhammerii Hellb. (1865)
- Pertusaria stenospora A.W.Archer & Elix (2016)
- Pertusaria stictica Nugra, A.W.Archer, Bungartz & Elix (2015)
- Pertusaria subambigens Dibben (1980)
- Pertusaria subarida A.W.Archer & Elix (2006)
- Pertusaria subcerussata A.W.Archer (1992)
- Pertusaria subcopelandii Jariangpr. (2006) – Thailand
- Pertusaria subisidiosa A.W.Archer (1991)
- Pertusaria submalvinae A.W.Archer & Elix (2013) – Australia
- Pertusaria submaritima A.W.Archer & Elix (2019)
- Pertusaria suboculata Brodo & Dibben (1980)
- Pertusaria subplanaica A.W.Archer & Elix (1992)
- Pertusaria subradians Müll.Arg. (1884)
- Pertusaria subrigida Müll.Arg. (1895)
- Pertusaria subviolacea Q.Ren (2014)
- Pertusaria superiana Lendemer & E.Tripp (2018)
- Pertusaria sydneyensis A.W.Archer & Elix (1997)

== T ==
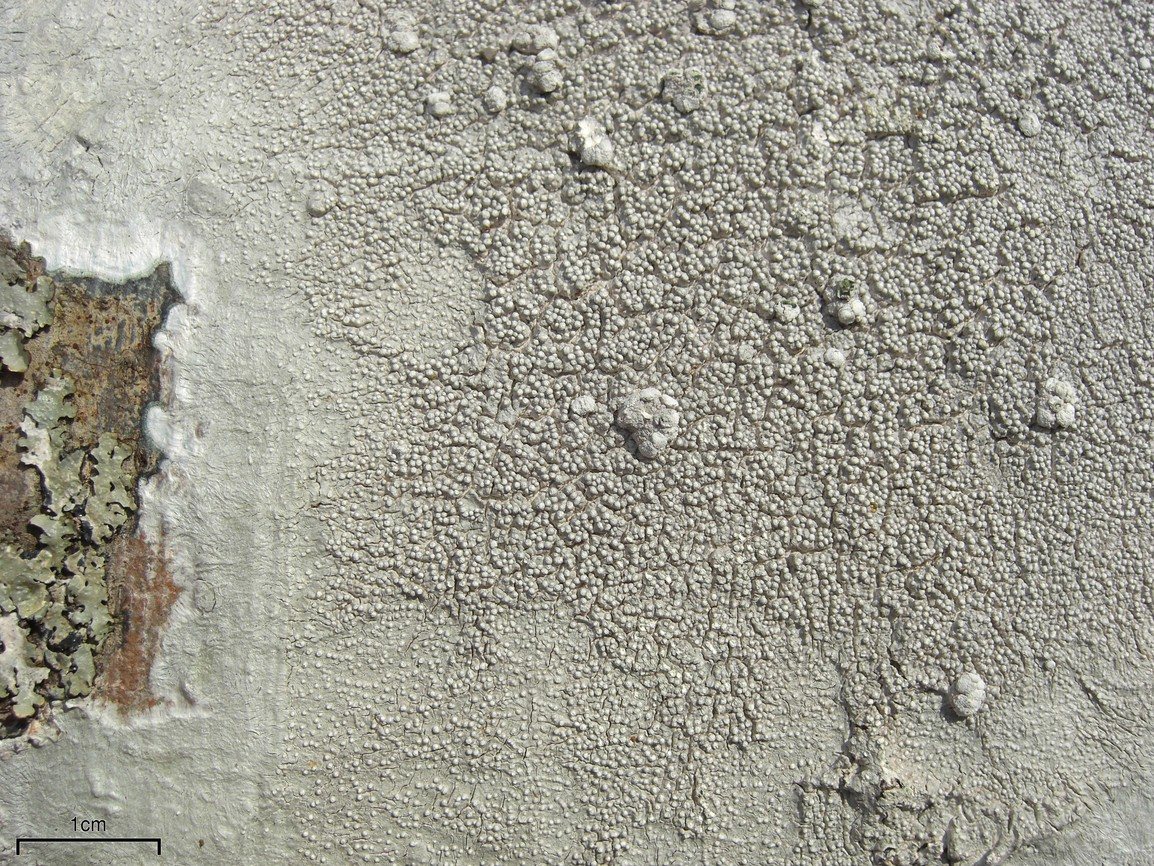
Pertusaria trachythallina

- Pertusaria taibaiensis Q.Ren (2014)
- Pertusaria takensis Jariangpr. & A.W.Archer (2004) – Thailand
- Pertusaria tejocotensis B.de Lesd. (1918)
- Pertusaria ternata A.W.Archer & Elix (2017)
- Pertusaria tetrathalamia (Fée) Nyl. (1863)
- Pertusaria texana Müll.Arg. (1884)
- Pertusaria thailandica Jariangpr. (2005) – Thailand
- Pertusaria thioisidiata Yánez-Ayabaca, Bungartz, A.W.Archer & Elix (2015)
- Pertusaria thiophaninica A.W.Archer (1991)
- Pertusaria thiospoda C.Knight (1882)
- Pertusaria thula A.W.Archer (1991)
- Pertusaria thwaitesii Müll.Arg. (1884)
- Pertusaria tjaetabensis A.W.Archer & Elix (2009)
- Pertusaria trachyspora A.W.Archer (1991)
- Pertusaria trevethensis A.W.Archer (1991)
- Pertusaria trimera (Müll.Arg.) A.W.Archer (1991)

== U ==
- Pertusaria undulata Müll.Arg. (1893)
- Pertusaria uttaraditensis Jariangpr. (2005) – Thailand

== V ==
- Pertusaria valliculata Dibben (1980)
- Pertusaria variabilis Elix & A.W.Archer (2008) – Australia
- Pertusaria verdonii A.W.Archer (1992)
- Pertusaria verruculifera Vain. (1890)
- Pertusaria vulpina A.W.Archer (1991)

== W ==
- Pertusaria wallingatensis A.W.Archer & Elix (2019)
- Pertusaria wenxianensis Q.Ren (2014)
- Pertusaria werneriana Boqueras (2003)
- Pertusaria wilsoniana A.W.Archer & Elix (2009)
- Pertusaria wirthii Elix & A.W.Archer (2013) – New Zealand
- Pertusaria wui Q.Ren (2022)
- Pertusaria wulfenioides B.de Lesd. (1929)

== X ==
- Pertusaria xanthodactylina A.W.Archer & Elix (1997)
- Pertusaria xanthodes Müll.Arg. (1884)
- Pertusaria xanthoisidiata A.W.Archer, Bungartz & Elix (2015)
- Pertusaria xantholeucoides Müll.Arg. (1889)
- Pertusaria xanthonaria A.W.Archer & Elix (1993)
- Pertusaria xanthoplaca Müll.Arg. (1882)
- Pertusaria xanthosorediata A.W.Archer (1991)
- Pertusaria xenismota A.W.Archer & Elix (1997)
- Pertusaria xylophyes A.W.Archer (1992)

== Y ==
- Pertusaria yulongensis Q.Ren (2016) – China
- Pertusaria yunnana Guo L.Zhou & Lu L.Zhang (2014) – China
- Pertusaria yupna A.W.Archer & Elix (1998) – Papua New Guinea
