= Pertusaria xanthoisidiata =

Scientific classification
- Domain: Eukaryota
- Kingdom: Fungi
- Division: Ascomycota
- Class: Lecanoromycetes
- Order: Pertusariales
- Family: Pertusariaceae
- Genus: Pertusaria
- Species: P. xanthoisidiata

Binomial name
- Pertusaria xanthoisidiata A.W.Archer, Bungartz & Elix (2015)

Species of lichen

Pertusaria xanthoisidiata is a species of corticolous (bark-dwelling), crustose lichen in the family Pertusariaceae. Found on the Galápagos Islands, it was formally described as a new species in 2015 by Alan W. Archer, Frank Bungartz, and John Elix. The type specimen was collected on Pinta Island, where it was growing on an exposed trunk of Opuntia galapageia. The species epithet refers to the yellow-coloured isidia.

== Description ==
Pertusaria xanthoisidiata forms a crust-like growth on tree bark. Its main body (thallus) is a pale yellowish-green colour and can appear either dull or somewhat shiny. The surface is smooth and unwaxed, and whilst initially flat, it soon becomes densely covered with small, finger-like projections called isidia. These isidia are granular to cylindrical in shape, sometimes branching, and measure about 0.1–0.16 mm in width and 0.15–0.7 mm in height. Beneath the surface layer, the internal tissue (medulla) is white throughout.

The edges of the lichen may occasionally show faint circular zones and are typically bordered by a dark brownish margin called a prothallus. No reproductive structures, such as apothecia (disc-like fruiting bodies) or pycnidia (flask-shaped structures), have been observed in this species.

When tested with chemical spot tests, the surface layer (cortex) is P−, K−, and C+ (orange). The internal tissue (medulla) P+ (orange), K+ (yellow), and C−. Under ultraviolet light, it may display a faint orange glow. Chemical analysis has revealed the presence of several secondary metabolites, including various forms of chlorolichexanthone, arthothelin, and several stictic acids.

== See also ==
- List of Pertusaria species
