= Pertusaria cerroazulensis =

Scientific classification
- Domain: Eukaryota
- Kingdom: Fungi
- Division: Ascomycota
- Class: Lecanoromycetes
- Order: Pertusariales
- Family: Pertusariaceae
- Genus: Pertusaria
- Species: P. cerroazulensis

Binomial name
- Pertusaria cerroazulensis Bungartz, A.W.Archer, Yánez-Ayabaca & Elix (2015)

Species of lichen

Pertusaria cerroazulensis is a species of corticolous (bark-dwelling), crustose lichen in the family Pertusariaceae. Found on the Galápagos Islands, it was formally described as a new species in 2015 by Frank Bungartz, Alan W. Archer, Alba Yánez-Ayabaca, and John Elix. The type specimen was collected from the Cerro Azul volcano (Isabela Island) at an altitude of 1,038 m (3,406 ft), where in a small, shaded woodland, it was growing on twigs of Psidium galapageium. The species epithet refers to the type locality.

== Description ==
Pertusaria cerroazulensis has a crust-like thallus varying from a continuous to a rimose surface. It appears ivory, creamy white, or pale beige with a dull to slightly shiny, smooth surface that may be wrinkled or rugose. It does not have soredia or isidia. The medulla is white and the margin is not distinctly zonate. It is usually delimited by a thin, compact, black prothallus, especially where it adjoins other thalli.

The apothecia are hemispherical and verruciform, ranging in diameter from 0.7 to 1.2 (occasionally up to 1.8) mm. They are single or occasionally fuse together, and are moderately to distinctly constricted at the base. They are the same colour as the thallus and flattened apically, with one to four greyish to blackish, punctiform to papillate ostioles. The thalline exciple is hyaline and has few large crystals that persist in K. There are abundant minute crystals that dissolve to form a yellow solution in K, which may contain stictic acid. The cortex lacks crystals.

The epihymenium is pale olive and does not react to K. The proper exciple and hypothecium are hyaline to pale yellowish and are not inspersed with crystals. The hymenium is not inspersed, consisting of branched and sparingly anastomosing hyphae that are more or less loosely intertwined around asci. The cylindrical asci contain 4–8 spores. The ascospores are hyaline, narrowly ellipsoid, and range from 29 to 88 μm in length and 17–63 μm in width. The spore wall is 2-layered, with an inner wall that is 2–3 μm wide, smooth to irregular, and apically more or less thickened (approximately 4–6 μm), and an outer wall that is 2–4 (occasionally up to 6) μm thick, smooth to very faintly ornamented. No pycnidia were observed in this species.

Lichexanthone, 2-chlorolichexanthone, 2,4-dichlorolichexanthone, stictic acid, cryptostictic acid, and constictic acid are lichen products that are found in this species.

== See also ==
- List of Pertusaria species
