= Pertusaria litchiicola =

Scientific classification
- Kingdom: Fungi
- Division: Ascomycota
- Class: Lecanoromycetes
- Order: Pertusariales
- Family: Pertusariaceae
- Genus: Pertusaria
- Species: P. litchiicola

Binomial name
- Pertusaria litchiicola Jariangpr. & A.W.Archer (2003)
- Holotype: Doi Suthep–Pui National Park, Thailand

Species of lichen

Pertusaria litchiicola is a species of corticolous (bark-dwelling) crustose lichen in the family Pertusariaceae. Found in Thailand, it was described as a new species in 2003.

== Taxonomy ==
Pertusaria litchicola was first formally described by the lichenologists Sureeporn Jariangprasert and Alan W. Archer based on specimens collected from northern Thailand. The species epithet litchicola is derived from the Latin litchi (referring to the lychee tree, Litchi chinensis) and cola (meaning dweller), indicating the lichen's habitat on the bark of lychee trees. The species epithet was originally spelled litchicola, but has since been corrected to litchiicola.

The species bears similarities to Pertusaria veltoziae, particularly in its chemical composition as both species contain divaricatic acid derivatives. However, P. litchicola is distinguished by its rough ascospores in contrast to the smooth spore walls in P. veltoziae. A significant taxonomic feature is the presence of methyl 2-O-methyldivaricatate as a major compound, which marks an unusual occurrence in the genus Pertusaria. While esters of orcinol depsides are rare in the genus Pertusaria, the occurrence of an orcinol depside methyl ester as a major lichen compound had not been previously reported before the discovery of P. litchicola.

== Description ==
The thallus (main body) of Pertusaria litchicola is corticolous, meaning it grows on tree bark. It appears yellowish ivory to greyish green in colour, with a smooth and dull surface that is slightly rugose (wrinkled). The lichen lacks both isidia and soredia, which are vegetative reproductive structures found in some other lichen species. The reproductive structures (apothecia) are conspicuous and wart-like (verruciform), scattered across the thallus surface and rarely joining together (confluent). These apothecia are the same colour as the thallus, constricted at the base, and range from round to oblong in shape, sometimes appearing flattened. The surface margin of these structures is granular, measuring 0.3–0.95 mm in diameter.

The pores (ostioles) through which spores are released are inconspicuous, translucent, and yellowish to grey in colour, occasionally becoming nipple-shaped (mammiform). Each reproductive structure typically contains 1–2 pores. The reproductive sacs (asci) contain two, rarely three, spores arranged longitudinally. These spores (ascospores) are ellipsoid to cylindrical in shape, measuring 86–150 μm in length and 26–44 μm in width. They have a rough surface texture, and their outer wall measures 5–12 μm in thickness.

When tested with standard chemical reagents used in lichen identification, P. litchicola produces these reactions: negative or pale yellow with potassium hydroxide solution (K– or K+ pale yellow), and orange-red under ultraviolet light (UV+). Chemical analysis reveals several secondary metabolites present in the lichen, including methyl 2-O-methyldivaricatate as a major component, 2-O-methyldivaricatic acid (ranging from major to minor concentrations), and 4,5-dichlorolichexanthone (minor to trace amounts).

== Habitat and distribution ==
Pertusaria litchicola is found in the northern and northeastern regions of Thailand. It inhabits evergreen hill forests and mixed Fagaceae/deciduous forests at elevations ranging from 870 to 1,340 m (2,850 to 4,400 ft) above sea level. It has also been documented growing in lychee orchards, which is reflected in its species name.

The type specimen was collected from Doi Suthep–Pui National Park in Chiang Mai province, Thailand, specifically in a woodpile of hill tribe, on the bark of Litchi chinensis at an elevation of 1,340 m (4,400 ft). Additional specimens have been collected from various locations across Thailand, including Nahaco National Park in Loei province (found on the bark of Schima wallichii in evergreen hill forest at 870 metres elevation) and near the Kun Maengai RFD camp in Chiang Mai Province (found in mixed Fagaceae/deciduous forest at 1100 metres elevation). Pertusaria hylocola is one of about 40 Pertusaria species that are known to occur in Thailand.

== See also ==
- List of Pertusaria species
