= Pertusaria medullamarilla =

Scientific classification
- Domain: Eukaryota
- Kingdom: Fungi
- Division: Ascomycota
- Class: Lecanoromycetes
- Order: Pertusariales
- Family: Pertusariaceae
- Genus: Pertusaria
- Species: P. medullamarilla

Binomial name
- Pertusaria medullamarilla Yánez-Ayabaca, Bungartz, A.W.Archer & Elix (2015)

Species of lichen

Pertusaria medullamarilla is a species of saxicolous (rock-dwelling), crustose lichen in the family Pertusariaceae. Found on the Galápagos Islands, it was formally described as a new species in 2015 by lichenologists Alba Yánez-Ayabaca, Frank Bungartz, Alan W. Archer, and John Elix. The type specimen was collected on Pinzón Island, where it was found growing on basalt. The species epithet refers to its yellow-coloured medulla (amarilla is Spanish for yellow).

== See also ==
- List of Pertusaria species
