= Pertusaria thioisidiata =

Scientific classification
- Domain: Eukaryota
- Kingdom: Fungi
- Division: Ascomycota
- Class: Lecanoromycetes
- Order: Pertusariales
- Family: Pertusariaceae
- Genus: Pertusaria
- Species: P. thioisidiata

Binomial name
- Pertusaria thioisidiata Yánez-Ayabaca, Bungartz, A.W.Archer & Elix (2015)

Species of lichen

Pertusaria thioisidiata is a species of corticolous (bark-dwelling), crustose lichen in the family Pertusariaceae. Found on the Galápagos Islands, it was formally described as a new species in 2015 by Alba Yánez-Ayabaca, Frank Bungartz, Alan W. Archer, and John Elix. The type specimen was collected on the Alcedo Volcano (Isabela Island) at an altitude of 1,146 m (3,760 ft); there, on a southeast-exposed slope about 100 m (330 ft) below the rim of the crater, it was found growing on basalt. The species epithet refers to the presence of both isidia and the substance thiophaninic acid. The variety Pertusaria thioisidiata var. isidiogyrophorica contains gyrophoric acid rather than thiophaninic acid.

== See also ==
- List of Pertusaria species
