= Pertusaria pseudoparotica =

Scientific classification
- Domain: Eukaryota
- Kingdom: Fungi
- Division: Ascomycota
- Class: Lecanoromycetes
- Order: Pertusariales
- Family: Pertusariaceae
- Genus: Pertusaria
- Species: P. pseudoparotica

Binomial name
- Pertusaria pseudoparotica Sipman (2002)

Species of lichen

Pertusaria pseudoparotica is a species of saxicolous (rock-dwelling), crustose lichen in the family Pertusariaceae. It is known from a few localities in Greece's Aegean Islands.

== Taxonomy ==
Pertusaria pseudoparotica was formally described as a new species in 2015 by Dutch lichenologist Harrie Sipman. The type specimen was collected by Sipman and Thomas Raus from the Kefalos peninsula of Kos, one of the East Aegean Islands. There, at an altitude of about 200 m (660 ft), the lichen was found growing on siliceous rock outcrops near the coast. It is named for its similarity with Pertusaria parotica. This similar species lacks protocetraric acid, and has a different number of spores per ascus. Sipman decided to treat the Greek species as distinct, "in accordance with the appreciation of chemical differences in recent monographs on the genus", citing Alan Archer's 1993 work on the genus Pertusaria.

== Description ==
The crustose thallus of Pertusaria pseudoparotica has a dull greyish to pale brownish white colour, and often reaches sizes of over 10 cm (3.9 in). It is surrounded by a dark prothallus. The form of the thalli is both areolate and papillose (with blister-like structures), with individual areoles measuring 0.2–0.6 mm wide. The apothecia are flat and more or less circular (discoid), and have a grey, circular disc (0.3–0.5 mm wide) with whitish pruina. Asci contain two spores and measure about 200 by 50 μm. The ascospores are smooth and ellipsoid, measuring 100–126 by 50 μm.

Protocetraric acid is the major lichen product in Pertusaria pseudoparotica, although trace amounts of gyrophoric acid and atranorin can be detected using thin-layer chromatography.

== Habitat and distribution ==
Pertusaria pseudoparotica grows on the full sun-exposed, slanting faces of siliceous rocks, including andesite. Although it is only known to occur in a few localities on Kos (in the East Aegean Islands), and on Santorini (in the Cyclades archipelago), it is locally common. It has been recorded from elevations ranging from 200 to 600 m (660 to 1,970 ft).

== See also ==
- List of Pertusaria species
