= Pertusaria stictica =

Scientific classification
- Domain: Eukaryota
- Kingdom: Fungi
- Division: Ascomycota
- Class: Lecanoromycetes
- Order: Pertusariales
- Family: Pertusariaceae
- Genus: Pertusaria
- Species: P. stictica

Binomial name
- Pertusaria stictica Nugra, A.W.Archer, Bungartz & Elix (2015)

Species of lichen

Pertusaria stictica is a species of corticolous and lignicolous (bark- and wood-dwelling), crustose lichen in the family Pertusariaceae. Found on the Galápagos Islands, it was formally described as a new species in 2015 by Fredy Nugra, Alan W. Archer, Frank Bungartz, and John Elix. The type specimen was collected at the border of the Galápagos National Park (Santa Cruz Island) at an altitude of 471 m (1,545 ft), where in a secondary forest it was found growing on Psidium galapageium. The species epithet refers to stictic acid, a major metabolite in the lichen. It also contains trace amounts of constictic acid.

== See also ==
- List of Pertusaria species
