= Pertusaria hylocola =

Scientific classification
- Kingdom: Fungi
- Division: Ascomycota
- Class: Lecanoromycetes
- Order: Pertusariales
- Family: Pertusariaceae
- Genus: Pertusaria
- Species: P. hylocola

Binomial name
- Pertusaria hylocola Jariangpr. & A.W.Archer (2003)

Species of lichen

Pertusaria hylocola is a species of corticolous (bark-dwelling) crustose lichen in the family Pertusariales. Found in Thailand, it was described as a new species in 2003.

== Taxonomy ==
Pertusaria hylocola was first described as a new species in a scientific publication authored by the lichenologists Sureeporn Jariangprasert and Alan Archer. The species epithet hylocola derives from the Greek word hylo (meaning wood) and the Latin suffix cola (meaning dweller), referring to the fallen log substrate where the type specimen was collected.

The species is closely related to Pertusaria injuncana, with both sharing similar reproductive structures. However, P. hylocola can be distinguished by its unique chemical composition, particularly the presence of additional stictic and hyperlatolic acids not found in P. injuncana. While the combination of thiophaninic and stictic acids is common in the genus Pertusaria, the combination of these acids with an orcinol depside is rare and has only been previously reported from P. paradoxica.

== Description ==
Pertusaria hylocola possesses a corticate thallus that is yellowish, continuous, with a surface that appears smooth and slightly shiny. The lichen lacks both isidia and soredia, structures often found in other lichen species. Its reproductive structures, known as apothecia, are verruciform (wart-like), conspicuous, and scattered across the thallus without becoming confluent. These apothecia are hemispherical in shape and measure between 0.3 and 0.85 mm in diameter.

The ostioles (pores in the reproductive structures) are conspicuous and translucent, ranging in colour from yellowish to grey. They are slightly raised and surrounded by yellowish translucent tissue, with typically one ostiole per verruca. Each reproductive sac (ascus) contains from 6 to 8 spores arranged in a single row or irregularly, occasionally appearing in two rows near the base. The spores themselves are ellipsoid, measuring 64–89 μm in length and 28–42 μm in width, with a smooth surface. The outer wall of each spore is 6–10 μm thick.

The lichen's chemistry is distinctive, producing characteristic colour reactions when tested with standard lichen spot tests. It tests K+ (yellow), KC+ (yellow-orange), C+ (yellow-orange), P+ (orange), and appears bright orange under ultraviolet light UV. Chemical analysis reveals several lichen substances including stictic acid and constictic acid as major components, with minor amounts of perlatolic acid, hyperlatolic acid, and thiophaninic acid. Other compounds are present in trace amounts, including norstictic acid, cryptostictic acid, peristictic acid, methyl pseudolusitanate, and 2-chloro-6-O-methylnorlichexanthone.

== Habitat and distribution ==
Pertusaria hylocola is considered a rare, endemic, corticolous species known only from its type locality in Thailand. The holotype specimen was collected by Jariangprasert on 9 June 2001 from a fallen log in Bo Kluea Nhuea Community, Bo Kluea District, Nan Province. The collection site is situated on the right wayside before the fourteenth kilometre stone on the road from Bo Kluea Nhuea to Bo Kluar District, at an elevation of about 1,000 m (3,300 ft). Pertusaria hylocola is one of about 40 Pertusaria species that are known to occur in Thailand.

== See also ==
- List of Pertusaria species
