= Pertusaria lueckingii =

Scientific classification
- Domain: Eukaryota
- Kingdom: Fungi
- Division: Ascomycota
- Class: Lecanoromycetes
- Order: Pertusariales
- Family: Pertusariaceae
- Genus: Pertusaria
- Species: P. lueckingii

Binomial name
- Pertusaria lueckingii Bungartz, A.W.Archer & Elix (2015)

Species of lichen

Pertusaria lueckingii is a species of corticolous (bark-dwelling), crustose lichen in the family Pertusariaceae. Found on the Galápagos Islands, it was formally described as a new species in 2015 by Frank Bungartz, Alan W. Archer, and John Elix. The type specimen was collected on Floreana Island, where it was found growing on the bark of a south-exposed trunk of Cedrella odorata. The species epithet honours German lichenogist Robert Lücking, "who first recognized this taxon as an independent species".

== Description ==
The lichen has a thallus that grows on the bark of trees, wood, or rocks. The thallus is crusty and can be continuous or have cracks. The surface of the thallus can be greenish white, greenish grey, or greenish brown with a shiny and smooth texture. There is no powder on the surface, and it is flat. The soralia, which are reproductive structures, are irregularly shaped, ranging from 0.3 to 1.5 mm in size, and are scattered throughout the thallus. They are usually single but can sometimes be found together. The soredia, which are clusters of algal cells surrounded by fungal hyphae, are coarse and granular or have a coral-like appearance. The medulla, which is the inner layer of the thallus, is white. The margin of the thallus is not clearly divided and is surrounded by a shiny black prothallus. This lichen does not produce apothecia or pycnidia.

== See also ==
- List of Pertusaria species
