= Pertusaria galapagoensis =

Scientific classification
- Kingdom: Fungi
- Division: Ascomycota
- Class: Lecanoromycetes
- Order: Pertusariales
- Family: Pertusariaceae
- Genus: Pertusaria
- Species: P. galapagoensis

Binomial name
- Pertusaria galapagoensis Elix, Yánez-Ayabaca, A.W.Archer & Bungartz (2015)

Species of lichen

Pertusaria galapagoensis is a species of corticolous (bark-dwelling), crustose lichen in the family Pertusariaceae. Found on the Galápagos Islands, it was formally described as a new species in 2015 by Elix, Yánez-Ayabaca, A.W.Archer & Bungartz. The type specimen was collected on Floreana Island at an altitude of 371 m (1,217 ft), where it was found growing on the bark of a south-exposed trunk of Cedrella odorata. The species epithet refers to its distribution.

== Description ==
Pertusaria galapagoensis has a crustose thallus that grows on tree bark, featuring a pale mineral-grey or pale olive surface that can be either dull or shiny. Its smooth surface may have fine fissures but lacks soredia, isidia, and a powdery coating (pruina). The wart-like apothecial verrucae on the thallus surface are eroded at the apex and occasionally pruinose, while the innermost layer, or medulla, is white. The margin is not distinctly zonate, and a compact, glossy black prothallus delimits it.

The apothecia are disc-shaped to more or less spherical, measuring 0.5–1.4 mm in diameter, with some reaching up to 2.2 mm. They can be solitary or rarely fused, constricted at their base, and are mono- to polycarpic. The apothecia have 1–6 blackish grey to jet black punctiform ostioles, which are small spore-releasing openings. The thalline exciple is transparent and contains large crystals that persist when treated with a potassium hydroxide solution. The hymenium is sparsely to strongly inspersed with oil droplets and contains branched hyphae that intertwine around the asci. The asci are cylindrical and 2–4 spored, while the ascospores are hyaline and oblong to ellipsoid or broadly fusiform, measuring 54–101 μm in length and 32–53 μm in width.

== See also ==
- List of Pertusaria species
