= Pertusaria southlandica =

Scientific classification
- Kingdom: Fungi
- Division: Ascomycota
- Class: Lecanoromycetes
- Order: Pertusariales
- Family: Pertusariaceae
- Genus: Pertusaria
- Species: P. southlandica

Binomial name
- Pertusaria southlandica A.Knight, Elix & A.W.Archer (2011)
- Type locality: Southland, New Zealand

Species of lichen-forming fungus

Pertusaria southlandica is a species of bark-dwelling crustose lichen in the family Pertusariaceae. It forms a pale grey-white crust on tree bark and produces wart-like fruiting bodies with several small pores on each. The species is known only from Fiordland in the South Island of New Zealand.

== Taxonomy ==
Pertusaria southlandica was described as a new species in 2011 by Allison Knight, John Elix and Alan Archer, based on material collected during a botanical society trip to western Fiordland (South Island, New Zealand). The species name refers to Southland, the district where it was found.

== Description ==
The thallus is a pale grey-white, crust that grows on bark (corticolous). It is finely cracked (rimose) and becomes thicker and rougher in fertile patches and where it meets neighbouring crusts, thinning towards the edge. The surface is dull to slightly shiny and lacks pruina, isidia and soredia. A faint black prothallus may sometimes be visible.

The fruiting bodies are wart-like (verruciform) apothecia. They are flattened to hemispherical, usually crowded, and about 2–3 mm across, the same colour as the thallus. Each verruca has a thick, smooth margin and several pale ostioles (small openings) (about 3–8), which are conspicuous and slightly sunken. The ascospores are ellipsoid and colourless, with two rough-walled spores per ascus, measuring about 87–105 × 30–50 μm.

Chemical analysis (using thin-layer chromatography and high-performance liquid chromatography) found conhypoprotocetraric acid as the major lichen product, with 2-chlorolichexanthone and hypoprotocetraric acid as minor substances and protocetraric acid present only in trace amounts. Standard chemical spot tests were negative in the cortex (K−, C−, KC−), while the P test is yellow-orange and UV light gives a dull brick-red reaction in the thallus and a bright white fluorescence in the medulla.

=== Similar species ===
In their original account, the authors compared it with the coastal Australian Pertusaria thwaitesii, which differs in having black ostioles, longer ascospores, and protocetraric acid as the main compound; they also compared it with the New Zealand endemic Pertusaria vallicola, which has smaller, single-ostiolate verrucae and a different major secondary metabolite (hypoprotocetraric acid). Another New Zealand species, P. allosorodes, is also similar in appearance to P. southlandica, but contains 2-O-methylstenosporic acid as its major metabolite.

== Habitat and distribution ==
Pertusaria southlandica is known only from its type locality in Southland, on the South Island of New Zealand, where it was collected at a forest edge at Boyd Creek, about 20 km west of Te Anau Downs. The holotype specimen (OTA 60696) was found on a fallen twig of Nothofagus solandri. At the original collection site it occurred alongside several other Pertusaria species, including P. psoromica, P. thamnolica, P. truncata and P. velata.

In the 2018 edition of the Conservation status of New Zealand indigenous lichens and lichenicolous fungi, P. southlandica appears for the first time, where it is given the status "data deficient".

== See also ==
- List of Pertusaria species
