= Pertusaria aptrootii =

Scientific classification
- Domain: Eukaryota
- Kingdom: Fungi
- Division: Ascomycota
- Class: Lecanoromycetes
- Order: Pertusariales
- Family: Pertusariaceae
- Genus: Pertusaria
- Species: P. aptrootii

Binomial name
- Pertusaria aptrootii A.W.Archer & Elix (1998)

Species of lichen

Pertusaria aptrootii is a species of crustose lichen in the family Pertusariaceae. It was described as a new species in 1998 by Alan W. Archer and John Alan Elix. The lichen occurs in Papua New Guinea, and is known from only two specimens collected at the type locality. The type was collected in Varirata National Park at an altitude of 800 m (2,600 ft), where it was found growing on conglomerate rock. It is named after Dutch lichenologist André Aptroot, who collected the type.

The lichen has a dull fawn, thick, crustose thallus that is cracked and areolate (divided into small, usually rounded to polygonal to irregular areas). It has numerous wart-shaped apothecia that are 1–2 mm in diameter. Between two and four point-like, black ostioles (pore-like openings through which the spores escape) are on each apothecium. Pertusaria aptrootii makes ascospores that are ellipsoid, smooth, and measure 108–125 μm long by 37–48 μm wide. They invariably number four per ascus, in contrast to some other Pertusaria species found in the same country, which may occasionally have asci with three or five ascospores. Characteristic secondary chemicals found in the lichen include 2-chlorolichexanthone, 2-O-methylsuperlatolic acid, and stictic acid.

== See also ==
- List of Pertusaria species
