= Pertusaria albineoides =

Scientific classification
- Domain: Eukaryota
- Kingdom: Fungi
- Division: Ascomycota
- Class: Lecanoromycetes
- Order: Pertusariales
- Family: Pertusariaceae
- Genus: Pertusaria
- Species: P. albineoides

Binomial name
- Pertusaria albineoides Bungartz, A.W.Archer, Yánez-Ayabaca & Elix (2015)

Species of lichen

Pertusaria albineoides is a species of corticolous (bark-dwelling), crustose lichen in the family Pertusariaceae. Found on the Galápagos Islands, it was formally described as a new species in 2015 by Frank Bungartz, A.W.Archer, Alba Yánez-Ayabaca, and John Elix. The type specimen was collected on Alcedo Volcano (Isabela Island) at an altitude of 1,089 m (3,573 ft), where it was found growing on a partially shaded, rain- and wind-exposed trunk of Scalesia microcephala. The species epithet refers to the similarity to the species Pertusaria albinea, from which it differs by having thin-walled ellipsoid-shaped ascospores that are longer and narrower.

== Description ==
The thallus, or vegetative body, of Pertusaria albineoides is crust-like and can range from continuous to cracked. The surface of the thallus is typically greyish white to pale beige, with a dull or slightly shiny appearance. It is generally smooth, lacking any raised structures or reproductive organs like soredia or isidia. The medulla, or inner layer of the thallus, is white. The margin of the thallus is not distinctly separated into different zones and is often marked by a thin, compact, black prothallus when it is next to other thalli.

The apothecia, or fruiting bodies, of Pertusaria albineoides are wart-shaped to hemispherical and typically range from 0.3 to 0.7 mm in diameter, sometimes up to 1 mm. They are usually single and do not fuse together. They are not constricted at their base and are the same colour as the thallus. They can be mono- or polycarpic and have one or two brownish black, punctiform ostioles (openings) that are delimited by a thin, translucent rim. The thalline exciple, or outermost layer of the apothecia, is dull brown on the outside and hyaline (colorless) on the inside. It contains a few large crystals that persist in potassium hydroxide (KOH) and abundant minute crystals that dissolve in KOH. The epihymenium, or layer just above the hymenium, is pale olive in color and can turn violet in KOH. The proper exciple and hypothecium, which make up the inner layers of the apothecia, are hyaline to pale yellowish in colour and are not speckled with crystals. The hymenium, or layer that contains the asci (spore-containing structures), is not speckled with crystals and consists of branched and sparingly anastomosing hyphae (fungal threads), which are loosely intertwined around the asci. The asci are cylindrical and contain 8 spores. The ascospores are hyaline and narrowly ellipsoid in shape. They range from 39 to 78 μm in length and 16 to 31 μm in width. The spore wall is 2-layered, with an inner wall that is 3–4 μm wide and smooth, and an outer wall that is 2–3 μm thick and has faint microrugulate ornamentation (fine wrinkles or grooves). Pycnidia have not been observed in Pertusaria albineoides.

== See also ==
- List of Pertusaria species
