= Pertusaria conspersa =

Scientific classification
- Kingdom: Fungi
- Division: Ascomycota
- Class: Lecanoromycetes
- Order: Pertusariales
- Family: Pertusariaceae
- Genus: Pertusaria
- Species: P. conspersa

Binomial name
- Pertusaria conspersa Messuti (2011)

Species of lichen

Pertusaria conspersa is a rare species of saxicolous (rock-dwelling), crustose lichen in the family Pertusariaceae. Found in the central region of Chile, this crustose lichen has a distinct yellowish-brown colour, which stands out against the rocks it grows on. It is known only from three locations in the Valparaíso and San Felipe de Aconcagua Provinces of Chile.

== Taxonomy ==
Pertusaria conspersa was first described by Argentine lichenologist María Inés Messuti and can be found in the central region of Chile. The species name, conspersa, comes from the Latin word conspersus ("sprinkled"), referring to the appearance of the cream-coloured soralia on the brownish thallus. The type specimen was collected in October 1960 at Cuesta La Dormida, north of Santiago, Chile.

== Description ==
Pertusaria conspersa is characterized by its crustose, light to moderate yellowish-brown (hazel) thallus with a smooth and dull surface. The areolae are flattened to slightly bullate and vary in shape from orbicular to angular or irregular. The lichen lacks isidia and features cream-coloured, orbicular soralia that are numerous and conspicuous, either solitary or crowded. The soredia are granular, with a diameter of 0.10–0.15 mm. Apothecia and pycnidia have not been observed in this species. The lichen contains haemathamnolic acid as a major substance, and thamnolic acid in major, minor, or trace quantities.

This species can be distinguished from other saxicolous Pertusaria species by its chemistry, especially the presence of haemathamnolic acid.

== Habitat and distribution ==
Pertusaria conspersa is a saxicolous species, meaning it grows on rocks, specifically on quartz and sandstone. It can be found at elevations of 1,000–1,200 m (3,300–3,900 ft) in open and exposed areas. The lichen is uncommon and at the time of its publication, had only been found in three localities within the V Región de Valparaíso (Valparaíso and San Felipe de Aconcagua Provinces) in central Chile.

== See also ==
- List of Pertusaria species
