= Pertusaria kansriae =

Scientific classification
- Domain: Eukaryota
- Kingdom: Fungi
- Division: Ascomycota
- Class: Lecanoromycetes
- Order: Pertusariales
- Family: Pertusariaceae
- Genus: Pertusaria
- Species: P. kansriae

Binomial name
- Pertusaria kansriae Jariangpr. (2005)

Species of lichen

Pertusaria kansriae is a rare species of corticolous (bark-dwelling), crustose lichen in the family Pertusariaceae. Found in Thailand, it was formally described as a new species in 2005 by Sureeporn Jariangprasert. The type specimen was collected by the author from the Doi Inthanon National Park (Chom Thong district, Chiang Mai) at an altitude of 980 m (3,220 ft), where it was found growing on a tree trunk in a mixed forest; the species is known only from this specimen. The species epithet kansriae honours Thai lichenologist Kansri Boonpragob, who inspired the author to study lichens. Distinguishing characteristics of the lichen are the number of ascospores in the ascus (four), and the presence of the lichen products 4,5-dichlorolichexanthone and 2'-O-methylstenosporic acid.

== See also ==
- List of Pertusaria species
