= Pertusaria guineabissauensis =

Scientific classification
- Domain: Eukaryota
- Kingdom: Fungi
- Division: Ascomycota
- Class: Lecanoromycetes
- Order: Pertusariales
- Family: Pertusariaceae
- Genus: Pertusaria
- Species: P. guineabissauensis

Binomial name
- Pertusaria guineabissauensis Paz-Berm., A.W.Archer & Elix (2019)

Species of lichen

Pertusaria guineabissauensis is a species of crustose lichen in the family Pertusariaceae. It was described as a new species in 2019 by Graciela Paz-Bermúdez, Alan Archer, and John Elix. It grows on tree bark, producing a thick greenish-grey thallus with a dull, wrinkled surface. The lichen is characterised by the presence of wart-shaped (verruciform) ascomata, asci that contain eight ascospores arranged in a single row (uniseriate) and the presence of the secondary chemicals stictic and hypostictic acids. The specific epithet refers to Guinea-Bissau, where the lichen was discovered, and its only known locality.

== See also ==
- List of Pertusaria species
