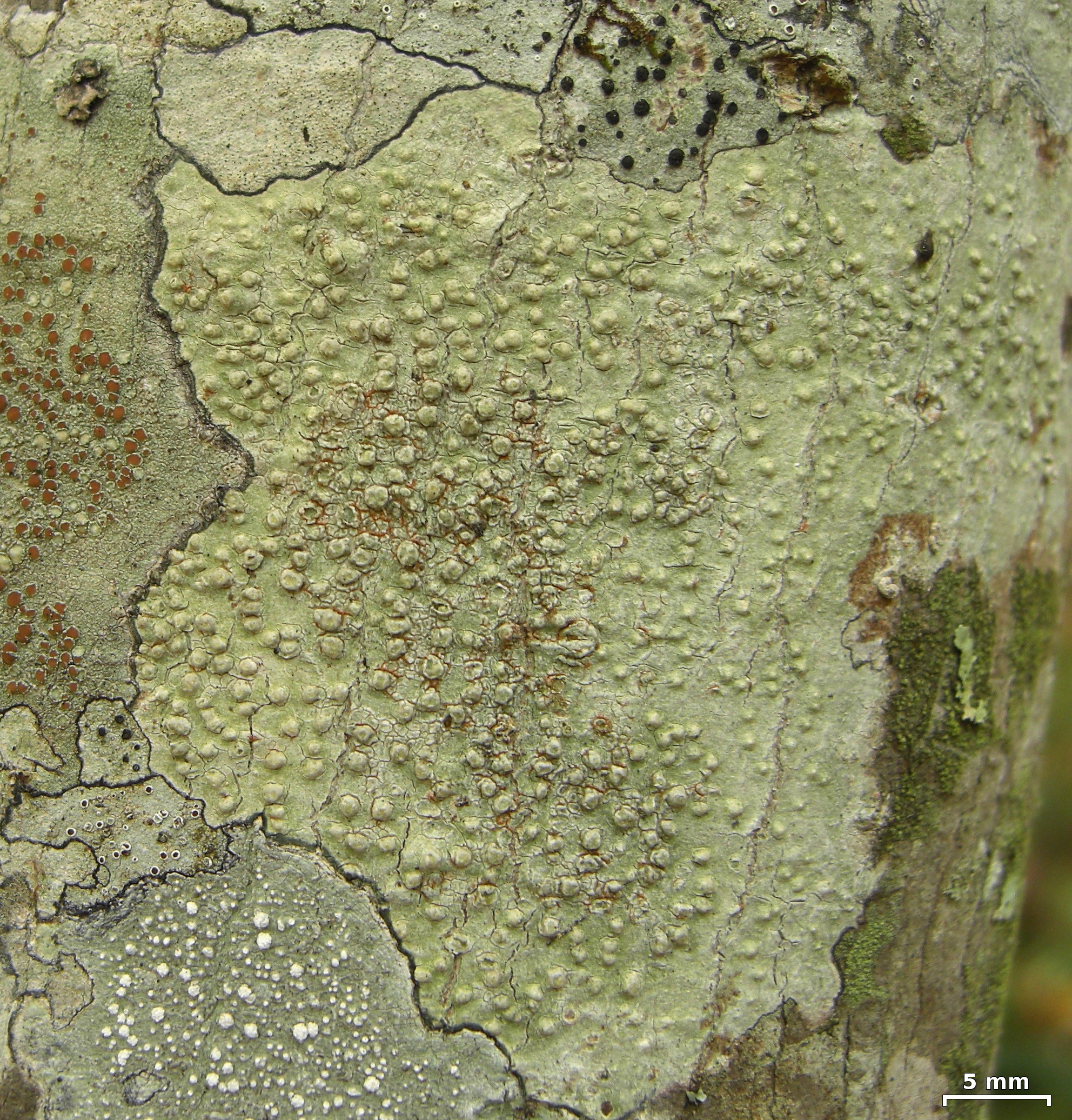

Conservation status
- Apparently Secure (NatureServe)

Scientific classification
- Kingdom: Fungi
- Division: Ascomycota
- Class: Lecanoromycetes
- Order: Pertusariales
- Family: Pertusariaceae
- Genus: Pertusaria
- Species: P. texana

Binomial name
- Pertusaria texana Müll.Arg. (1884)

= Pertusaria texana =

Species of lichen

Pertusaria texana, the Texas wart lichen, is a species of corticolous (bark-dwelling), crustose lichen in the family Pertusariaceae. It is found in Mexico and the southwestern United States, where it grows on the bark of various trees.

== Taxonomy ==
It was described as a new species in 1884 by the Swiss botanist Johannes Müller Argoviensis. He characterized it as having a thin, whitish-yellow thallus surrounded by a dark border zone (prothallus). He noted that its surface was irregularly granular and eventually becomes cracked. Müller Argoviensis described the species' distinctive warts as small, irregularly hemispherical, and angular, sometimes only slightly raised from the surface, with multiple scattered ostioles that were hemispherically prominent and matched the thallus colour, except for dark brown spots in their centers. He observed that the species produced (6-)8 spores per ascus, arranged in two rows in the upper part of the ascus and in a single row elsewhere, measuring 45–55 μm long and 22–25 μm wide, which he noted were small for the genus.

In his taxonomic assessment, Müller Argoviensis determined that P. texana was most closely related to P. meridionalis, but distinguished it by its differently coloured ostioles, which were the same color as the grayish-yellow warts except for occasionally yellowish tips and blackening centers, rather than being intensely sulfur-colored. The type specimen was collected by Jacob Boll from tree bark near Dallas, Texas.

== Description ==
The lichen has a yellowish thallus (body) with poriform apothecia (fruiting bodies) and warted verrucae (wart-like projections). It features small ostioles (pore-like openings) that have yellow papillae at their tips. The asci (spore-containing cells) each contain eight smooth-walled ascospores. The species produces several secondary metabolites including: stictic acid and thiophaninic acid (major substances); constictic acid, 2-chloro-6-O-methylnorlichexanthone, and 4-chloro-6-O-methylnorlichexanthone (minor substances).

Pertusaria texana can be confused with P. xanthodes, which shares similar chemical compounds but differs in having:

- hyaline (clear) ostioles rather than yellow ones
- two-spored rather than eight-spored asci
- rough-walled rather than smooth-walled ascospores

Another rare lookalike from Florida, P. epixanthoa, has depressed rather than raised ostioles, and variolaric rather than stictic acid.

== Habitat and distribution ==
Pertusaria texana is a corticolous (bark-dwelling) species that grows on various trees including Acacia, Jatropha, and Quercus (oak). It occurs at elevations between 100–1,200 m (330–3,940 ft). The species has been documented in Mexico and the southwestern United States.

== See also ==
- List of Pertusaria species
