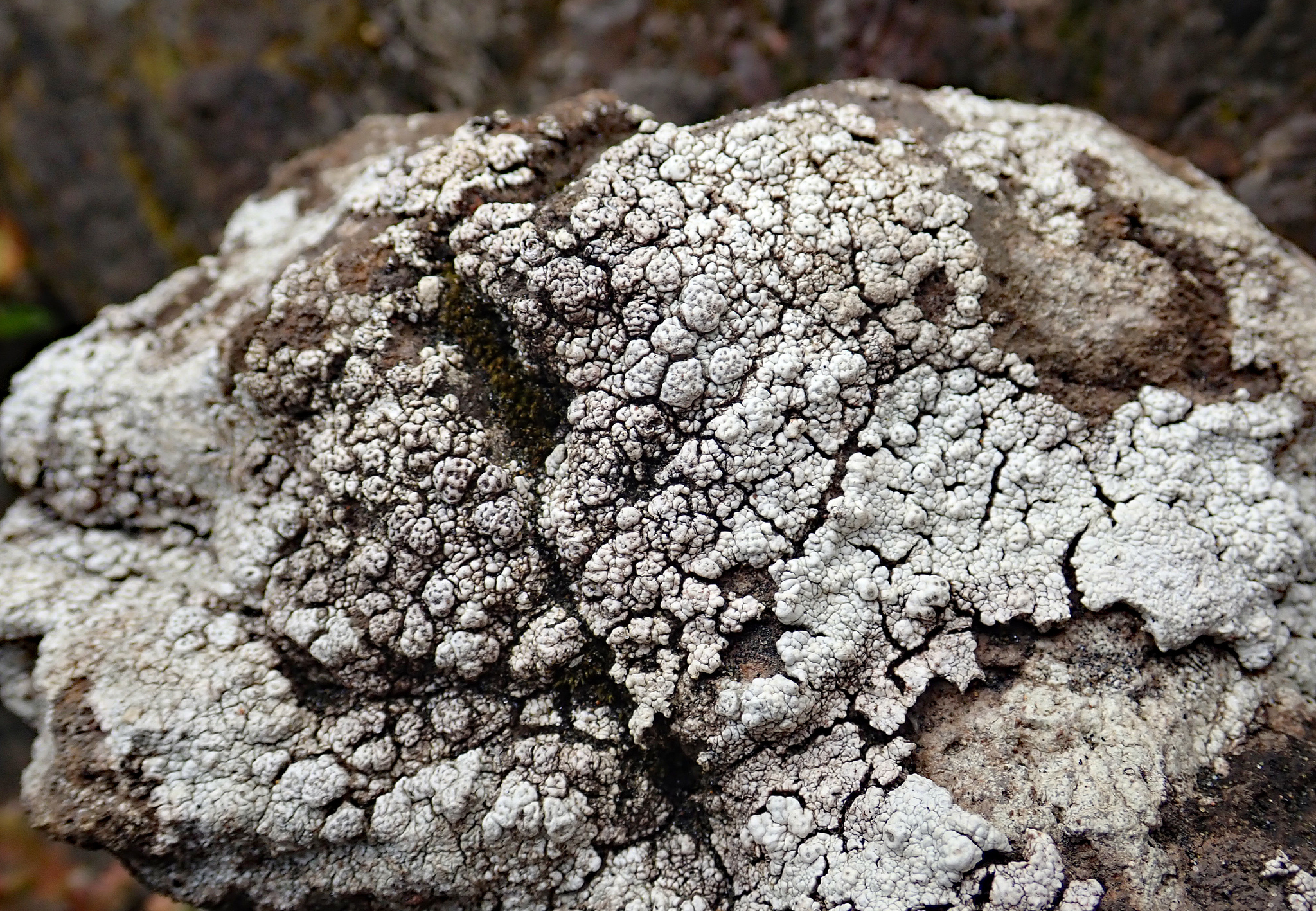

Scientific classification
- Domain: Eukaryota
- Kingdom: Fungi
- Division: Ascomycota
- Class: Lecanoromycetes
- Order: Pertusariales
- Family: Pertusariaceae
- Genus: Pertusaria
- Species: P. allanii

Binomial name
- Pertusaria allanii Zahlbr. (1941)

= Pertusaria allanii =

Species of lichen

Pertusaria allanii is a species of saxicolous (rock-dwelling) and crustose lichen in the family Pertusariaceae. Found in New Zealand, it was scientifically described as a new species in 1941 by Austrian-Hungarian lichenologist Alexander Zahlbruckner. The type specimen was collected from Waiheke Island (North Island), where it was found growing on coastal rock. The specific epithet allanii honours the collector, New Zealand botanist Harry Allan. As of 2018, in the New Zealand Threat Classification System, the lichen is considered "At Risk – Naturally Uncommon".

== See also ==
- List of Pertusaria species
