= Pertusaria thailandica =

Scientific classification
- Kingdom: Fungi
- Division: Ascomycota
- Class: Lecanoromycetes
- Order: Pertusariales
- Family: Pertusariaceae
- Genus: Pertusaria
- Species: P. thailandica

Binomial name
- Pertusaria thailandica Jariangpr. (2005)

Species of lichen

Pertusaria thailandica is a species of corticolous (bark-dwelling), crustose lichen in the family Pertusariaceae. Found in Thailand, it was formally described as a new species in 2005 by Sureeporn Jariangprasert. The type specimen was collected by the author from Doi Suthep–Pui National Park (Chiang Mai province) at an altitude of 1,100 m (3,600 ft), where it was found growing on the bark of Cinchona. The species epithet combines the country of the type locality with the Latin suffix -ensis ("place of origin").

Pertusaria thailandica has a smooth, dull, greyish-green thallus that lacks soredia and isidia. It has many verruciform apothecia that measure 0.3–1.5 mm in diameter. Its ascospores, which number 3 or 4 per ascus, are smooth, uniseriate, somewhat fusiform to ellipsoid in shape, and measure 80–108 by 34–44 μm. The lichen is common in several Thai national parks in various parts of the country, at elevations ranging between 900 and 1,700 m (3,000 and 5,600 ft). It contains several homologues of the lichen product 2'-O-methylperlatolic acid.

== See also ==
- List of Pertusaria species
