= Pertusaria darwiniana =

Scientific classification
- Domain: Eukaryota
- Kingdom: Fungi
- Division: Ascomycota
- Class: Lecanoromycetes
- Order: Pertusariales
- Family: Pertusariaceae
- Genus: Pertusaria
- Species: P. darwiniana

Binomial name
- Pertusaria darwiniana Yánez-Ayabaca & Bungartz (2015)

Species of lichen

Pertusaria darwiniana is a species of corticolous-lignicolous (bark- and wood-dwelling), crustose lichen in the family Pertusariaceae. Found on the Galápagos Islands, it was formally described as a new species in 2015 by Alba Yánez-Ayabaca and Frank Bungartz. The type specimen was collected on the Darwin volcano (Isabela Island) at an altitude of 860 m (2,820 ft), where it was found growing on twigs of Croton scouleri. The species epithet acknowledges the Charles Darwin Foundation, and its namesake, Charles Darwin.

== Description ==
Pertusaria darwiniana has a crust-like thallus that ranges from continuous (thin thalli may be barely fissured) to rimose. The surface appears greenish white to greenish grey with a dull to slightly shiny, smooth, and epruinose plane. The soralia range from 0.1 to 0.7 mm in diameter and are greyish white with a distinctly yellowish to pale pinkish tinge, possibly caused by xanthone compounds. They are sparse to abundant, single and dispersed, not confluent, flattened to barely excavate, and circular in outline. They are distinctly delimited by a broad thalline margin that is approximately 0.1 mm wide. In thin and poorly developed specimens, this margin may be thin and more or less membranaceous. The soredia are farinose to more or less granular. The medulla is white and the margin is not distinctly zonate, set apart by a compact, shiny black prothallus, especially where it adjoins other thalli. No apothecia or pycnidia were observed in this species.

== See also ==
- List of Pertusaria species
