= Pertusaria loeiensis =

Scientific classification
- Kingdom: Fungi
- Division: Ascomycota
- Class: Lecanoromycetes
- Order: Pertusariales
- Family: Pertusariaceae
- Genus: Pertusaria
- Species: P. loeiensis

Binomial name
- Pertusaria loeiensis Jariangpr. (2005)

Species of lichen

Pertusaria loeiensis is a rare species of crustose lichen in the family Pertusariaceae. Found in Thailand, it was formally described as a new species in 2005 by Sureeporn Jariangprasert. The type specimen was collected from Nahaeo National Park (now Phu Suan Sai National Park) (Loei province) at an altitude of 540 m (1,770 ft), where it was found in a dry evergreen forest growing on the bark of Neolithea. It is only known to occur at this location. The species epithet combines the province of the type locality with the Latin -ensis ("place of origin"). The main distinguishing characteristics of Pertusaria loeiensis are its asci, which contain only two spores, and the presence of the lichen products 2-O-methylperlatolic acid and stictic acid.

== See also ==
- List of Pertusaria species
