= Pertusaria lichexanthoimmersa =

Scientific classification
- Domain: Eukaryota
- Kingdom: Fungi
- Division: Ascomycota
- Class: Lecanoromycetes
- Order: Pertusariales
- Family: Pertusariaceae
- Genus: Pertusaria
- Species: P. lichexanthoimmersa

Binomial name
- Pertusaria lichexanthoimmersa Aptroot & Cáceres (2018)

Species of lichen

Pertusaria lichexanthoimmersa is a rare species of crustose and corticolous (bark-dwelling) lichen in the family Pertusariaceae. Found in Bahia, Brazil, it was formally described as a new species in 2018 by lichenologists André Aptroot and Marcela Eugenia da Silva Cáceres. The type specimen was collected by the authors from the Morro do Pai Inácio (in Chapada Diamantina National Park) at an altitude between 1,050 and 1,140 m (3,440 and 3,740 ft); here the lichen was found growing on tree bark in a transitional forest. Pertusaria lichexanthoimmersa is only known to occur at the type locality (part of the Chapada Diamantina mountains), and is only known from the type specimen. The specific epithet lichexanthoimmersa refers both to the presence of lichexanthone as a secondary chemical, and the apothecia, which are immersed in the thallus. The lichen also contains norstictic acid.

== See also ==
- List of Pertusaria species
