= Pertusaria salazinica =

Scientific classification
- Domain: Eukaryota
- Kingdom: Fungi
- Division: Ascomycota
- Class: Lecanoromycetes
- Order: Pertusariales
- Family: Pertusariaceae
- Genus: Pertusaria
- Species: P. salazinica

Binomial name
- Pertusaria salazinica A.W.Archer & Elix (2017)

Species of lichen in the family Pertusariaceae

Pertusaria salazinica is a species of crustose lichen in the family Pertusariaceae. Found in Australia, it was described as a new species in 2017 by lichenologists Alan Archer and John Alan Elix. The type specimen was collected in Tully Gorge National Park (Queensland) at an altitude of 885 m (2,904 ft). Here, in a montane rainforest, it was found growing on a rotting log. The specific epithet refers to the presence of salazinic acid, a major secondary compound in the lichen. It also contains norstictic acid as a major metabolite, and connorstictic acid as a minor metabolite. Pertusaria salazinica is only known from the type specimen.

== See also ==
- List of Pertusaria species
