= Pertusaria krabiensis =

Scientific classification
- Kingdom: Fungi
- Division: Ascomycota
- Class: Lecanoromycetes
- Order: Pertusariales
- Family: Pertusariaceae
- Genus: Pertusaria
- Species: P. krabiensis

Binomial name
- Pertusaria krabiensis Jariangpr. (2005)

Species of lichen

Pertusaria krabiensis is a rare species of corticolous (bark-dwelling), crustose lichen in the family Pertusariaceae. Found in peninsular Thailand, it was formally described as a new species in 2005 by Sureeporn Jariangprasert. The type specimen was collected from near the Wat Thamp Suea Temple in Krabi; the species is known only from the type. The species epithet combines the name of the type locality with the Latin suffix -ensis ("place of origin"). The main distinguishing characteristics of Pertusaria krabiensis are its uniseriate ascospores (which number eight per ascus), and the presence of homologues of the lichen product 2-O-methylperlatolic acid.

== See also ==
- List of Pertusaria species
