= Pertusaria siamensis =

Scientific classification
- Domain: Eukaryota
- Kingdom: Fungi
- Division: Ascomycota
- Class: Lecanoromycetes
- Order: Pertusariales
- Family: Pertusariaceae
- Genus: Pertusaria
- Species: P. siamensis

Binomial name
- Pertusaria siamensis Jariangpr. (2005)

Species of lichen

Pertusaria siamensis is a species of corticolous (bark-dwelling), crustose lichen in the family Pertusariaceae. Found in Thailand, it was formally described as a new species in 2005 by Sureeporn Jariangprasert. The type specimen was collected by the author from the Chae Son National Park (Lampang province) at an altitude of 720 m (2,360 ft), where it was found in a dry dipterocarp forest growing on Shorea obtusa. The lichen is common in several Thai national parks in various parts of the country, occurring at elevations ranging from 200 to 1,600 m (660 to 5,250 ft). In addition to Shorea, Pertusaria siamensis has also been recorded growing on Dipterocarpus, Ficus, and Vatica. The species epithet combines the old name for Thailand ("Siam") with the Latin suffix -ensis ("place of origin").

== See also ==
- List of Pertusaria species
