= Pertusaria hypostictica =

Scientific classification
- Domain: Eukaryota
- Kingdom: Fungi
- Division: Ascomycota
- Class: Lecanoromycetes
- Order: Pertusariales
- Family: Pertusariaceae
- Genus: Pertusaria
- Species: P. hypostictica

Binomial name
- Pertusaria hypostictica Jariangpr. (2005)

Species of lichen

Pertusaria hypostictica is a species of corticolous (bark-dwelling), crustose lichen in the family Pertusariaceae. Found in Thailand, it was formally described as a new species in 2005 by Sureeporn Jariangprasert. The type specimen was collected from Khao Yai National Park (Nakhon Ratchasima province) at an altitude of 1,233 m (4,045 ft), where it was found growing on the bark of a Fagaceae plant. It has also been found in the peninsular region in the southern part of Thailand. The species epithet refers to the presence of hypostictic acid as a minor lichen product. It also contains stictic acid as a major substance, minor amounts of cryptostictic acid, peristictic acid, substictic acid, and trace amounts of constictic acid.

== See also ==
- List of Pertusaria species
