= Pertusaria lichexanthofarinosa =

Scientific classification
- Domain: Eukaryota
- Kingdom: Fungi
- Division: Ascomycota
- Class: Lecanoromycetes
- Order: Pertusariales
- Family: Pertusariaceae
- Genus: Pertusaria
- Species: P. lichexanthofarinosa

Binomial name
- Pertusaria lichexanthofarinosa Aptroot & Cáceres (2018)

Species of lichen

Pertusaria lichexanthofarinosa is a rare species of crustose and corticolous (bark-dwelling) lichen in the family Pertusariaceae. Found in Bahia, Brazil, it was formally described as a new species in 2018 by lichenologists André Aptroot and Marcela Eugenia da Silva Cáceres. The type specimen was collected by the authors near the Cachoeira do Mosquito (in Chapada Diamantina National Park, Lençóis) at an altitude between 450 and 500 m (1,480 and 1,640 ft); here the lichen was found growing on tree bark in Atlantic Forest. Pertusaria lichexanthofarinosa is only known to occur at the type locality (part of the Chapada Diamantina mountains), and is only known from the type specimen. The specific epithet lichexanthofarinosa refers both to the presence of the cortical secondary chemical lichexanthone, as well as the farinose (covered with a mealy powder) soredia.

== See also ==
- List of Pertusaria species
