= Pertusaria bokluensis =

Scientific classification
- Domain: Eukaryota
- Kingdom: Fungi
- Division: Ascomycota
- Class: Lecanoromycetes
- Order: Pertusariales
- Family: Pertusariaceae
- Genus: Pertusaria
- Species: P. bokluensis

Binomial name
- Pertusaria bokluensis Jariangpr. (2005)

Species of lichen

Pertusaria bokluensis is a rare species of corticolous (bark-dwelling), crustose lichen in the family Pertusariaceae. Found in Thailand, it was formally described as a new species in 2005 by Sureeporn Jariangprasert. The type specimen was collected from the Bo Kluea Nhuea community (Bo Kluea district) at an altitude of 1,000 m (3,300 ft), where it was found growing on the bark of Dalbergia. It is only known from the type specimen. The species epithet combines the name of the type locality with the Latin adjective -ensis, meaning "place of origin". The main distinguishing characteristics of Pertusaria bokluensis are the eight-spored asci, and the presence of the lichen products 4,5-dichlorolichexanthone and 2,2'-di-O-methylstenosporic acid.

== See also ==
- List of Pertusaria species
