= Pertusaria sipmanii =

Scientific classification
- Domain: Eukaryota
- Kingdom: Fungi
- Division: Ascomycota
- Class: Lecanoromycetes
- Order: Pertusariales
- Family: Pertusariaceae
- Genus: Pertusaria
- Species: P. sipmanii

Binomial name
- Pertusaria sipmanii A.W.Archer & Elix (1998)

Species of lichen in the family Pertusariaceae

Pertusaria sipmanii is a species of crustose lichen in the family Pertusariaceae. Found in Papua New Guinea, it was formally described as a new species in 1998 by Alan Archer and John Elix. The species epithet sipmanii honours Dutch lichenologist Harrie Sipman, who collected the type specimen.

== See also ==
- List of Pertusaria species
