= Pertusaria lichexanthoverrucosa =

Scientific classification
- Domain: Eukaryota
- Kingdom: Fungi
- Division: Ascomycota
- Class: Lecanoromycetes
- Order: Pertusariales
- Family: Pertusariaceae
- Genus: Pertusaria
- Species: P. lichexanthoverrucosa

Binomial name
- Pertusaria lichexanthoverrucosa Aptroot & Cáceres (2018)

Species of lichen

Pertusaria lichexanthoverrucosa is a rare species of crustose and corticolous (bark-dwelling) lichen in the family Pertusariaceae. Found in Bahia, Brazil, it was formally described as a new species in 2018 by lichenologists André Aptroot and Marcela Eugenia da Silva Cáceres. The type specimen was collected by the authors near the Cachoeira do Mosquito (in Chapada Diamantina National Park, Lençóis) at an altitude between 450 and 500 m (1,480 and 1,640 ft); here the lichen was found growing on tree bark in Atlantic Forest near a river. Pertusaria lichexanthoverrucosa is only known to occur at the type locality, which is part of the Chapada Diamantina mountains. The specific epithet lichexanthoverrucosa refers to both the presence of lichexanthone as well as the verrucose (warty) thallus.

== See also ==
- List of Pertusaria species
