= Pertusaria elixii =

Scientific classification
- Domain: Eukaryota
- Kingdom: Fungi
- Division: Ascomycota
- Class: Lecanoromycetes
- Order: Pertusariales
- Family: Pertusariaceae
- Genus: Pertusaria
- Species: P. elixii

Binomial name
- Pertusaria elixii Jariangpr. (2005)

Species of lichen

Pertusaria elixii is a rare species of corticolous (bark-dwelling), crustose lichen in the family Pertusariaceae. Found in Thailand, it was formally described as a new species in 2005 by Sureeporn Jariangprasert. The type specimen was collected by the author from Doi Inthanon National Park (Chom Thong district, Chiang Mai) at an altitude of 1,900 m (6,200 ft), where it was found growing on Betula alnoides. The species epithet honours Australian lichenologist John Elix, who assisted the author in chemical analysis of lichen specimens. Pertusaria elixii is distinguished from related species by the number of ascospores in its ascus (four), and the presence of 2'-O-methyl-substituted homologues of perlatolic acid.

== See also ==
- List of Pertusaria species
