= Pertusaria copelandii =

Scientific classification
- Kingdom: Fungi
- Division: Ascomycota
- Class: Lecanoromycetes
- Order: Pertusariales
- Family: Pertusariaceae
- Genus: Pertusaria
- Species: P. copelandii

Binomial name
- Pertusaria copelandii Vain. (1913)

Species of lichen-forming fungus

Pertusaria copelandii is a species of crustose lichen in the family Pertusariaceae. It was discovered on the island of Panay in the Philippines, where it grows on the bark of broad-leaved trees. The lichen forms a greyish to bluish-grey crust with a finely textured surface and produces irregularly shaped fruiting structures that can reach up to 3 millimetres in length. The species is named in honour of Edwin Copeland, an American botanist who collected plant specimens extensively throughout the Philippines in the early 20th century.

== Taxonomy ==
Pertusaria copelandii was first described by Finnish lichenologist Edvard August Vainio in 1913. The species honours the American botanist and pteridologist Edwin Copeland, who collected extensively in the Philippines. Vainio observed that it resembles Pertusaria communis in overall habit but differs in its pseudostromata and other structural details. He placed it within the section Leioplacara of Pertusaria.

== Description ==
Pertusaria copelandii is a crustose lichen with a thallus of medium thickness that is continuous or sometimes slightly broken into patches. The surface is finely warted to wrinkled and greyish to dull bluish-grey. It lacks soredia and isidia and shows no reaction to potassium hydroxide (K−) or calcium hypochlorite (C−). The thallus is partly bounded by a faintly blackish hypothallus.

The compound fruiting bodies (pseudostromata) are the same colour as the thallus and irregularly shaped, at first depressed-subglobose, later somewhat elongate. They measure about 1–3 mm long and 1–1.7 mm wide, with a slightly constricted base and a surface that is finely warted or rugose. Each pseudostroma usually contains several apothecia (1–5). The small verrucae are ashy-grey to blackish, sparse, and slightly raised. Both the thallus and pseudostromata are K− and C−.

The spores are typically two per ascus, occasionally four, arranged in one or two rows. They are colourless, oblong, with smooth, even walls about 0.005 mm thick, and measure 82–170 μm × 24–26 μm. The spores are not gelatinous.

== Habitat and distribution ==
The species was described from Panay, Philippines, based on material collected in Capiz by Copeland (no. 38 p.p.) on the bark of a broad-leaved tree. Pertusaria copelandii is one of six Pertusaria species that have been recorded from the Philippines, and one of three in the genus that was first described from specimens collected in the country. It has also been recorded from Papua New Guinea.

== See also ==
- List of Pertusaria species
