= Pertusaria rhodostoma =

Conservation status
- Data Deficient (IUCN 3.1)

Scientific classification
- Kingdom: Fungi
- Division: Ascomycota
- Class: Lecanoromycetes
- Order: Pertusariales
- Family: Pertusariaceae
- Genus: Pertusaria
- Species: P. rhodostoma

Binomial name
- Pertusaria rhodostoma Nyl. (1863)

Synonyms
- Pertusaria leioplaca subsp. rhodostoma (Nyl.) Nyl. (1863)

Species of lichen

Pertusaria rhodostoma is a little-known species of bark-dwelling lichen in the family Pertusariaceae. Known only from historical collections made in Colombia, it is classified as data deficient in the IUCN Red List.

== Taxonomy ==
Pertusaria rhodostoma was described as a new species by the Finnish lichenologist William Nylander. In the protologue, Nylander compared this species to Pertusaria leioplaca, noting its distinct rose-pink to rosy-scarlet ostioles, which are small and either slightly or barely sunken into the apothecia (fruiting bodies). The apothecia-bearing warts, measuring approximately 1 mm in diameter, are convex and relatively crowded on the lichen's surface. Most of these warts host a single apothecium, but some bear up to six.

He noted the spores of P. rhodostoma to be transparent and elongated, measuring 50–74 μm in length and 25–34 μm in width. The thallus was described as rough and uneven, with a whitish to pale ash-grey colouration. Nylander described it based on specimens collected by Wilhelm Lindig in Villeta, Colombia, at an elevation of 1,100 metres, where it was found growing on tree bark.

== Conservation ==
The conservation status of Pertusaria rhodostoma is listed as Data Deficient (DD) according to the IUCN. This designation reflects the lack of information regarding its population size, ecological characteristics, habitat preferences, and potential threats. The species has been documented from a single location in Villeta, Cundinamarca, Colombia, based on historical collections by Wilhelm Lindig. However, its taxonomy has not been recently reassessed, raising questions about its current validity and distribution.

No specific data exists on the population dynamics or abundance of P. rhodostoma, partly due to its clonal growth and the absence of detailed ecological studies. Its habitat and ecological preferences remain unknown, as do the threats it may face. Although there are no known uses or trade involving this lichen, its collection and commercialisation are prohibited under Colombian Resolution 0213 of 1977. To better understand and protect this species, researchers recommend taxonomic reevaluation, studies of its life history and ecology, and surveys to identify additional localities and characterise its habitat requirements.

== See also ==
- List of Pertusaria species
