= Pertusaria uttaraditensis =

Scientific classification
- Kingdom: Fungi
- Division: Ascomycota
- Class: Lecanoromycetes
- Order: Pertusariales
- Family: Pertusariaceae
- Genus: Pertusaria
- Species: P. uttaraditensis

Binomial name
- Pertusaria uttaraditensis Jariangpr. (2005)

Species of lichen

Pertusaria uttaraditensis is a rare species of corticolous (bark-dwelling), crustose lichen in the family Pertusariaceae. Found in Thailand, it was formally described as a new species in 2005 by Sureeporn Jariangprasert. The type specimen was collected from Phu Soi Dao National Park (Nam Pat district, Uttaradit province) at an elevation of 1,020 m (3,350 ft), where it was found growing on a foetid vine near a dry dipterocarp forest. The species epithet combines the province of the type locality with the Latin suffix -ensis ("place of origin").

The lichen has a smooth and dull, olive-green thallus with soredia, but lacking isidia. It contains 2'-O-methylperlatolic acid as a major lichen product.

== See also ==
- List of Pertusaria species
