= Pertusaria mccroryae =

Scientific classification
- Domain: Eukaryota
- Kingdom: Fungi
- Division: Ascomycota
- Class: Lecanoromycetes
- Order: Pertusariales
- Family: Pertusariaceae
- Genus: Pertusaria
- Species: P. mccroryae

Binomial name
- Pertusaria mccroryae Björk, Goward & T.Sprib. (2010)

Species of lichen

Pertusaria mccroryae is a species of white or greenish-white crustose lichen. It is found in northwestern North America (Alaska, British Columbia, Idaho, Oregon, and Montana), in forests with old trees. It grows from low elevation to 1,700 m (5,600 ft) on the bark of living trees (Picea sitchensis, Thuja plicata, and Tsuga heterophylla) or on logs, and is named in honor of Colleen McCrory, a Canadian environmental activist. The spore size and the chemistry distinguish it from other members of the genus.

== See also ==
- List of Pertusaria species
