= Pertusaria epacrospora =

Scientific classification
- Domain: Eukaryota
- Kingdom: Fungi
- Division: Ascomycota
- Class: Lecanoromycetes
- Order: Pertusariales
- Family: Pertusariaceae
- Genus: Pertusaria
- Species: P. epacrospora

Binomial name
- Pertusaria epacrospora A.W.Archer (1991)

Species of lichen

Pertusaria epacrospora is a rare species of corticolous (bark-dwelling), areolate lichen in the family Pertusariaceae. Found in Australia, it was formally described as a new species in 1991 by lichenologist Alan W. Archer. The type specimen was collected in Park Beach (Coffs Harbour, New South Wales) at sea level; here, it was found growing on trees in a coastal sand dune. The lichen has a thin, pale yellowish-green thallus lacking soredia and isidia. It has numerous wart-shaped apothecia, the same colour as the thallus, which measure 0.4–0.8 mm in diameter and which have a single, inconspicuous ostiole. The ascospores, which number 2 per ascus, are smooth and fusiform (spindle-shaped), typically measuring 125–150 μm long by 35–45 μm wide. Pertusaria epacrospora is only known to occur at the type locality. Secondary compounds found in the lichen are thiophaninic acid and stictic acid as major components, and minor to trace amounts of constictic acid and hypostictic acid.

== See also ==
- List of Pertusaria species
