= Pertusaria inthanonensis =

Scientific classification
- Domain: Eukaryota
- Kingdom: Fungi
- Division: Ascomycota
- Class: Lecanoromycetes
- Order: Pertusariales
- Family: Pertusariaceae
- Genus: Pertusaria
- Species: P. inthanonensis

Binomial name
- Pertusaria inthanonensis Jariangpr. (2005)

Species of lichen

Pertusaria inthanonensis is a species of crustose lichen in the family Pertusariaceae. Found in northern and northeastern Thailand, it was formally described as a new species in 2005 by Sureeporn Jariangprasert. The type specimen was collected by the author from the Doi Inthanon National Park (Chom Thong district, Chiang Mai) at an altitude of 1,900 m (6,200 ft), where it was found growing on the bark of a birch tree. The species epithet combines the name of the type locality with the Latin suffix ensis ("place of origin"). The main distinguishing characteristics of the lichen are its asci that contain either two or four smooth ascospores, and the presence of confluentic acid, stictic acid, and lichexanthone. The latter substance causes the thallus to fluoresce a bright yellow colours when lit with a long-wavelength UV light.

== See also ==
- List of Pertusaria species
