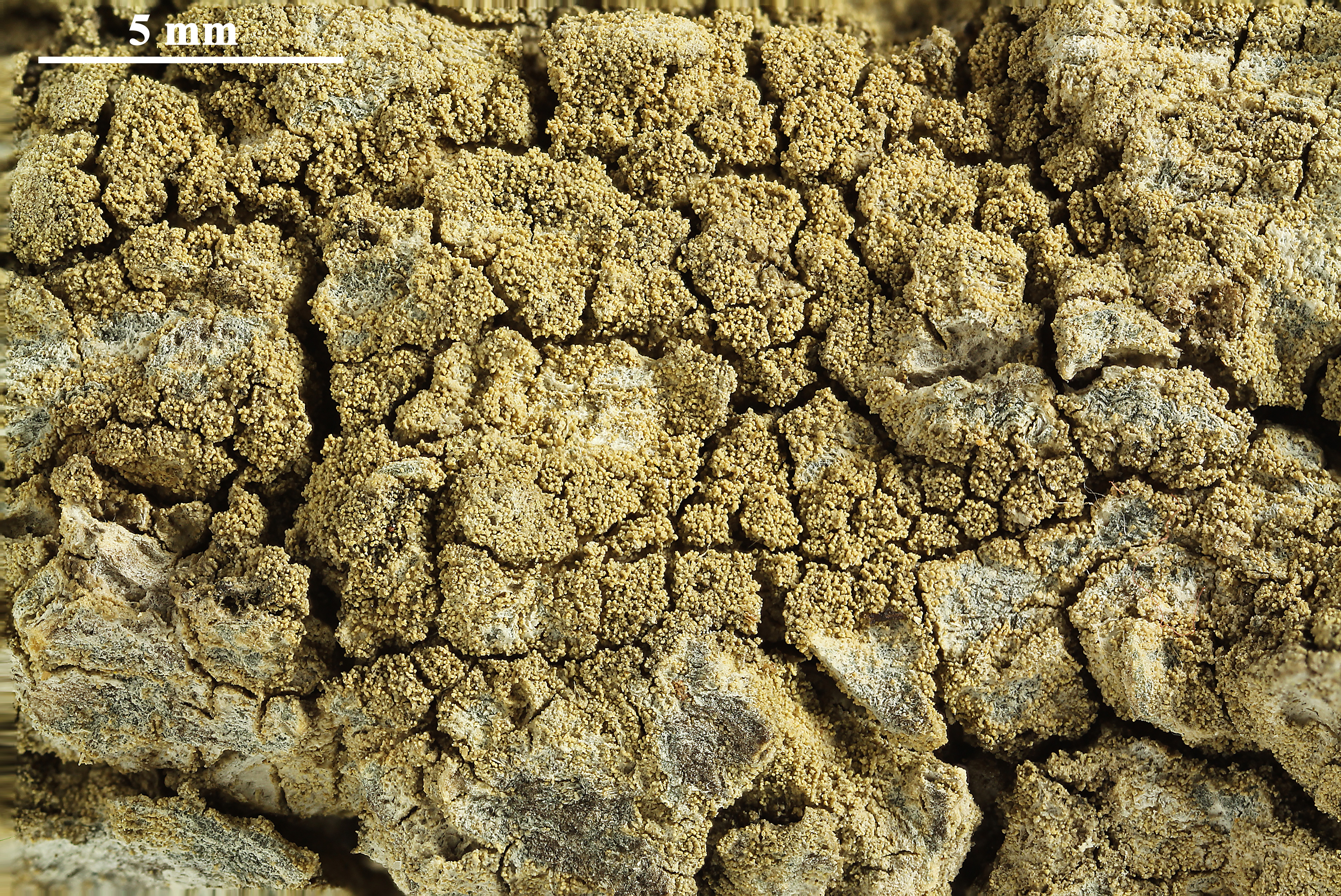

Scientific classification
- Domain: Eukaryota
- Kingdom: Fungi
- Division: Ascomycota
- Class: Lecanoromycetes
- Order: Pertusariales
- Family: Pertusariaceae
- Genus: Pertusaria
- Species: P. flavida

Binomial name
- Pertusaria flavida (DC.) J.R.Laundon (1963)

Synonyms
- Variolaria flavida DC. (1815)

= Pertusaria flavida =

Species of crustose lichen

Pertusaria flavida is a species of corticolous (bark-dwelling) crustose lichen in the family Pertusariaceae. First described in 1815, it is characterized by its distinctive pale to bright sulphur yellow or yellow-green-grey thallus with a cracked, warted surface. The lichen reproduces mainly through small spherical or cylindrical outgrowths called isidia, which occasionally break down into powdery structures, while fruiting bodies are very rare. It contains thiophaninic acid, giving it an orange fluorescence under ultraviolet light. Widespread throughout southern and eastern Britain, parts of Wales, Scotland, and Ireland, as well as mountainous regions of Spain and Portugal, P. flavida typically inhabits the bark of mature broad-leaved trees in well-lit environments such as open woodlands, parklands, and roadside trees.

== Taxonomy ==
It was first formally described as a new species by Augustin Pyramus de Candolle in 1815 as Variolaria flavida. Jack Laundon transferred it to the genus Pertusaria in 1963.

== Description ==
Pertusaria flavida has a distinctive pale or bright sulphur yellow to yellow-green-grey or yellow-brown thallus (the main body of the lichen). The thallus occasionally has a pale to dark grey margin and is characteristically rather thick and uneven, with a more or less coarsely rimose (cracked) appearance. The upper surface of the thallus is coarsely warted, flat, smooth, or somewhat roughened in texture. A distinctive feature of this species is the numerous isidia (small outgrowths used for vegetative reproduction), which are more or less spherical (globose) or shortly cylindrical-clavate in shape. These isidia occasionally dissolve into soredia (powdery propagules consisting of fungal hyphae wrapped around algal cells), sometimes obscuring the thallus entirely. When shed, these structures leave faint cortical scars on the thallus surface.

Apothecia (fruiting bodies) are very rare in this species. When present, approximately 2–5 apothecia are immersed within hemispherical warts that are sorediate-isidiate. The disc of the apothecium is black-brown and punctiform (dot-like). The asci (spore-producing sacs) contain 8 spores each (sometimes as few as four). The ascospores measure 60–100 by 25–40 μm, with a wall thickness of 7–10 μm, becoming less than 20 μm thick at the ends.

Chemical spot tests reveal that the thallus is C+ (orange) and KC+ (orange), K–, and Pd–. Under ultraviolet light, the thallus fluoresces bright orange or yellow-orange, indicating the presence of thiophaninic acid and an unidentified secondary metabolite.

== Habitat and distribution ==
In the United Kingdom, this lichen species inhabits both smooth and rough bark of mature broad-leaved trees that receive abundant light, with a particular preference for older oak (Quercus) specimens. Its typical habitats include open woodlands, parkland, and trees situated along roadsides. The distribution pattern shows a strong presence throughout southern and eastern Britain, extending into central and northern Wales. The species appears more sporadically across Scotland, while in Ireland it is encountered only infrequently. It is widespread in mountainous regions of the Iberian Peninsula, and has been documented in many localities in Spain and Portugal.

== See also ==
- List of Pertusaria species
