= Pertusaria ambigua =

Scientific classification
- Domain: Eukaryota
- Kingdom: Fungi
- Division: Ascomycota
- Class: Lecanoromycetes
- Order: Pertusariales
- Family: Pertusariaceae
- Genus: Pertusaria
- Species: P. ambigua

Binomial name
- Pertusaria ambigua A.W.Archer & Elix (2013)

Species of lichen

Pertusaria ambigua is a lichen in the family Pertusariaceae, and found in New South Wales, growing on trees.

It was first described in 2013 by Alan Archer and Jack Elix.
