= Pertusaria huneckiana =

Scientific classification
- Kingdom: Fungi
- Division: Ascomycota
- Class: Lecanoromycetes
- Order: Pertusariales
- Family: Pertusariaceae
- Genus: Pertusaria
- Species: P. huneckiana

Binomial name
- Pertusaria huneckiana Feige & Lumbsch (1993)

Species of lichen

Pertusaria huneckiana is a species of saxicolous (rock-dwelling), crustose lichen in the family Pertusariaceae. It is found in Mediterranean Europe.

== Taxonomy ==
It was formally described as a new species in 1993 by Guido Benno Feige and H. Thorsten Lumbsch. The type specimen was collected from sandstone in the Balearic Islands. The species epithet huneckiana honours chemist and lichenologist Siegfried Huneck.

== Description ==
Pertusaria huneckiana has a thick thallus (the main body of the lichen) with a cracked-areolate and verrucose texture. The thallus appears grey-greenish or yellow-green in colour and notably lacks both soredia (powdery propagules for asexual reproduction) and isidia (small cylindrical outgrowths also used for vegetative reproduction).

The species produces round apothecia (fruiting bodies) measuring 1–3 mm in diameter. These reproductive structures are typically numerous and tightly arranged on the thallus surface. The margin of each apothecium is thick and smooth, matching the colour of the surrounding thallus. The disc is black, initially appearing as a small dot (punctiform) but later developing into an open structure reaching up to 1.5 mm in diameter.

The fungal component of this lichen produces ascospores within asci (spore-producing sacs), typically with eight (sometimes as few as six) spores per ascus. These ascospores have a distinctive double and smooth wall structure and measure 70–100 by 30–50 μm.

Chemical spot testing shows that both the thallus and the margins of the apothecia are K+ (red), C+ (orange), KC+ (orange), and P+ (red-orange). The epithecium (the uppermost layer of the spore-producing region) is K+ (red-violet) and C+ (red-violet). The lichen contains thiophaninic acid and norstictic acid as its main secondary metabolites. Stictic acid is not detected when analyzed using thin-layer chromatography, which helps distinguish this species from similar Pertusaria species.

== Habitat and distribution ==
Pertusaria huneckiana is a saxicolous species, growing on siliceous rocks. It is only known from Menorca.

== See also ==
- List of Pertusaria species
