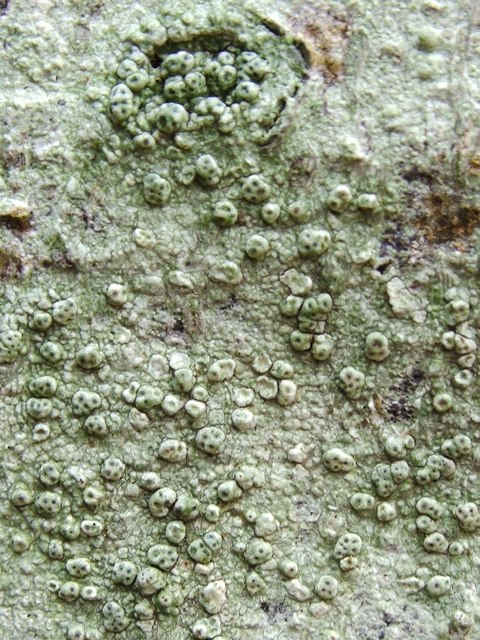

Scientific classification
- Kingdom: Fungi
- Division: Ascomycota
- Class: Lecanoromycetes
- Order: Pertusariales
- Family: Pertusariaceae
- Genus: Pertusaria
- Species: P. pertusa

Binomial name
- Pertusaria pertusa (L.) Tuck. (1845)

= Pertusaria pertusa =

Species of lichen-forming fungus

Pertusaria pertusa is a species of lichen-forming fungus in the family Pertusariaceae.

It is native to Eurasia and Southern Africa.

== See also ==
- List of lichens named by Carl Linnaeus
