= Pertusaria werneriana =

Scientific classification
- Kingdom: Fungi
- Division: Ascomycota
- Class: Lecanoromycetes
- Order: Pertusariales
- Family: Pertusariaceae
- Genus: Pertusaria
- Species: P. werneriana

Binomial name
- Pertusaria werneriana Boqueras (2003)

Species of lichen

Pertusaria werneriana is a rare species of corticolous (bark-dwelling) crustose lichen in the family Pertusariaceae. Found in southern Europe, it was described as a new species in 2003.

== Taxonomy ==
Pertusaria werneriana was described as a new species by the Spanish lichenologist Montserrat Boqueras in 2003. It was named in honour of the lichenologist Roger-Guy Werner, who assisted with collecting specimens in Spain. The lichen was first identified from these samples, with the type specimen originating from Andalusia, specifically from Canto del Caballo in Jerez de la Frontera, where it was found growing on Nerium oleander (oleander).

Taxonomically, P. werneriana shows morphological similarities to several other Pertusaria species. It bears a close resemblance to P. alpina from the Alps, P. carmelii from Israel, and P. gibberosa from Australia. However, these species can be differentiated based on their chemical composition and the number of ascospores (reproductive spores) contained within their asci (spore-producing sacs). A distinctive taxonomic feature of P. werneriana is its chemical profile, particularly the presence of 2'-O-methylperlatolic acid and confluenic acid, combined with the absence of stictic acid—a pattern that helps distinguish it from related species.

== Description ==
The thallus (main body) of Pertusaria werneriana appears cracked and areolate (divided into small, island-like areas) at the centre while remaining continuous at the margins. It has a somewhat verrucose (warty) texture and typically displays a pale grey-greenish to yellow-green colouration. The species lacks vegetative reproductive structures called soredia and isidia, which are present in some other lichen species.

Its reproductive structures (apothecia) are verruciform (wart-like), dispersed or grouped across the thallus surface. These structures measure 1–2 mm in diameter and are not constricted at the base, appearing as small mounds on the lichen surface. The ostioles (pores through which spores are released) are punctiform (dot-like) and pale in colour, with typically one to two ostioles per verruca (wart-like structure). Each reproductive sac (ascus) contains eight spores arranged in a single row (uniseriate). These ascospores are ellipsoid in shape, colourless, and measure 45–58 by 25–30 μm. They possess a double wall structure that appears smooth when viewed under magnification.

When tested with chemical spot tests used in lichen identification, the thallus is K+ (pale yellow), C−, and KC+ positive. Chemical analysis reveals the presence of coronaton, 2'-O-methylperlatolic acid, and confluentic acid as the main lichen products.

== Habitat and distribution ==
Pertusaria werneriana is a corticolous species, meaning it grows on the bark of trees and shrubs. It has been documented on a diverse range of woody plants including Olea europaea (olive), Opuntia sp. (prickly pear cactus), Phillyrea latifolia (green olive tree), Pistacia lentiscus (mastic tree), Quercus ilex (holm oak), Q. suber (cork oak), and Tilia cordata (small-leaved lime). The lichen shows a preference for young branches in warm and sunny habitats. It is considered characteristic of the association Lecanoro hybocarpeae–Caloplacetum pollinii, a specific ecological community of lichens.

Pertusaria werneriana has a Mediterranean distribution, with documented specimens primarily from various regions in Spain, including Andalusia, the Balearic Islands, Catalonia, and the Valencian Community. It has also been recorded in Corsica, France. This distribution pattern suggests an adaptation to Mediterranean climatic conditions, characterised by hot, dry summers and mild, wet winters. The lichen has also been reported from Greece, growing on Quercus coccifera. In a 2023 survey of the lichen flora of the cap Lardier area of France, it was described as a "rare Mediterranean species".

== See also ==
- List of Pertusaria species
