= Thamnochrolechia =

Scientific classification
- Domain: Eukaryota
- Kingdom: Fungi
- Division: Ascomycota
- Class: Lecanoromycetes
- Order: Pertusariales
- Family: Pertusariaceae
- Genus: Thamnochrolechia; Aptroot & Sipman (1991)

Type species
- Thamnochrolechia verticillata Aptroot & Sipman (1991)

Genus of fungi

Thamnochrolechia is a genus of lichenized fungi in the Pertusariaceae family. The genus is monotypic, containing the single species Thamnochrolechia verticillata, found in Papua New Guinea.
