= Loxosporopsis =

Conservation status
- Vulnerable (NatureServe)

Scientific classification
- Kingdom: Fungi
- Division: Ascomycota
- Class: Lecanoromycetes
- Order: Pertusariales
- Family: Pertusariaceae
- Genus: Loxosporopsis; Henssen (1995)
- Species: L. corallifera

Binomial name
- Loxosporopsis corallifera Brodo, Henssen & Imshaug (1995)

Single-species genus of lichen

Loxosporopsis is a fungal genus in the family Pertusariaceae. The genus is monotypic, containing the single crustose lichen species Loxosporopsis corallifera, found in northwestern North America.
