= Alan W. Archer =

Australian mycologist

- Born: 1930
- Academic career
- Author abbrev. (botany): A.W.Archer

Alan W. Archer (born 1930) is a mycologist and taxonomist. He is currently (January 2021) an honorary research associate at Royal Botanic Gardens Sydney. He uses chemotaxonomy as well as morphological features in taxonomy and to devise keys, most recently for the genus Pertusaria in the Australasia region.

During his career he has characterised and revised over 100 fungal taxa. He is an authority on the family Graphidaceae from the Australia - Pacific region and characterised Carbacanthographis salazinica and Phaeographis salazinica. He was also the first to characterise several members of the genus Pertusaria, Pertusaria ambigua Pertusaria epacrospora, Pertusaria guineabissauensis, Pertusaria salazinica, Pertusaria sipmanii and . An advanced search of the Mycobank database shows that he has authored some 101 fungi taxa, including Pertusaria xylophyes. (See also Taxa named by Alan W. Archer.)

The standard author abbreviation A.W.Archer is used to indicate this person as the author when citing a botanical name.

== Some publications ==
- Archer, Alan W.; Elix, John A. (27 February 2014). "Two new species and a new combination in the lichen genus Pertusaria from Brazil". Telopea. 16: 5–8. ISSN 0312-9764. Wikidata Q104982071.
- Frank Bungartz; John Elix; Alba Yánez-Ayabaca; Alan Archer (22 September 2015). "Endemism in the genus Pertusaria (Pertusariales, lichenized Ascomycota) from the Galapagos Islands". Telopea. 18: 325–369. doi:10.7751/TELOPEA8895. ISSN 0312-9764. Wikidata Q99888875.
- Archer, Alan W. (1991). "Synonymy and chemotaxonomy of Australian Pertusaria species (Lichenes) based on Australian type specimens". Telopea. 4 (2): 165–184. doi:10.7751/TELOPEA19914925. ISSN 0312-9764. Wikidata Q104984462.
- Alan W. Archer; John A. Elix; Eberhard Fischer; Dorothee Killmann; Emmanuël Sérusiaux (1 May 2009). "The lichen genus Pertusaria (Ascomycota) in Central Africa (Congo/Kivu, Rwanda and Burundi) and Western Kenya". Nova Hedwigia. 88 (3): 309–333. doi:10.1127/0029-5035/2009/0088-0309. ISSN 0029-5035. Wikidata Q99863687.
