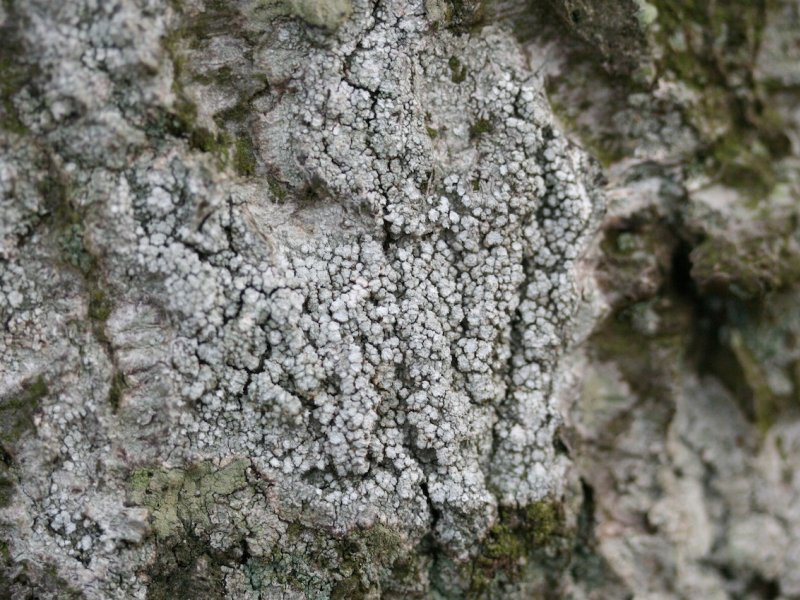
- Pertusaria amara

Scientific classification
- Kingdom: Fungi
- Division: Ascomycota
- Class: Lecanoromycetes
- Order: Pertusariales
- Family: Pertusariaceae; Körb. (1855)

Type genus
- Pertusaria DC. (1805)

Genera
- Lepra; Loxosporopsis; Pertusaria; Phyllophiale; Thamnochrolechia; Verseghya

Synonyms
- Variolariaceae Fée ex Zenker (1827)

= Pertusariaceae =

Family of lichen-forming fungi

The Pertusariaceae are a family of lichen-forming fungi in the order Pertusariales.

== Taxonomy ==
The family was formally circumscribed by German lichenologist Gustav Wilhelm Körber in 1846. It contained the genera Pertusaria and Ochrolechia until Pertusaria was shown to be polyphyletic in a 2006 publication. The family Ochrolechiaceae was created to contain Ochrolechia.

In 2012, a proposal by Alexander Doweld sought to conserve the family name Pertusariaceae against Variolariaceae, citing the illegitimacy of Variolariaceae due to its association with the invalid generic name Variolaria Pers. Despite this, the proposal was deemed unnecessary by a vote as the taxonomy of the family, which includes genera like Pertusaria and Variolaria, remains unsettled, and Variolariaceae was found to be an illegitimate name. Consequently, Pertusariaceae remains the valid and preferred family name.

== Genera ==
As of October 2021, Species Fungorum includes 6 genera and 379 species in the Pertusariaceae.

- Lepra Scop. (1777) – 81 spp.
- Loxosporopsis Henssen (1995) – 1 sp.
- Pertusaria DC. (1805) – ca. 300 spp.
- Phyllophiale R.Sant. (1952) – 1 sp.
- Thamnochrolechia Aptroot & Sipman (1991) – 1 sp.
- Verseghya S.Y.Kondr., Lőkös & Hur (2016) – 2 spp.
