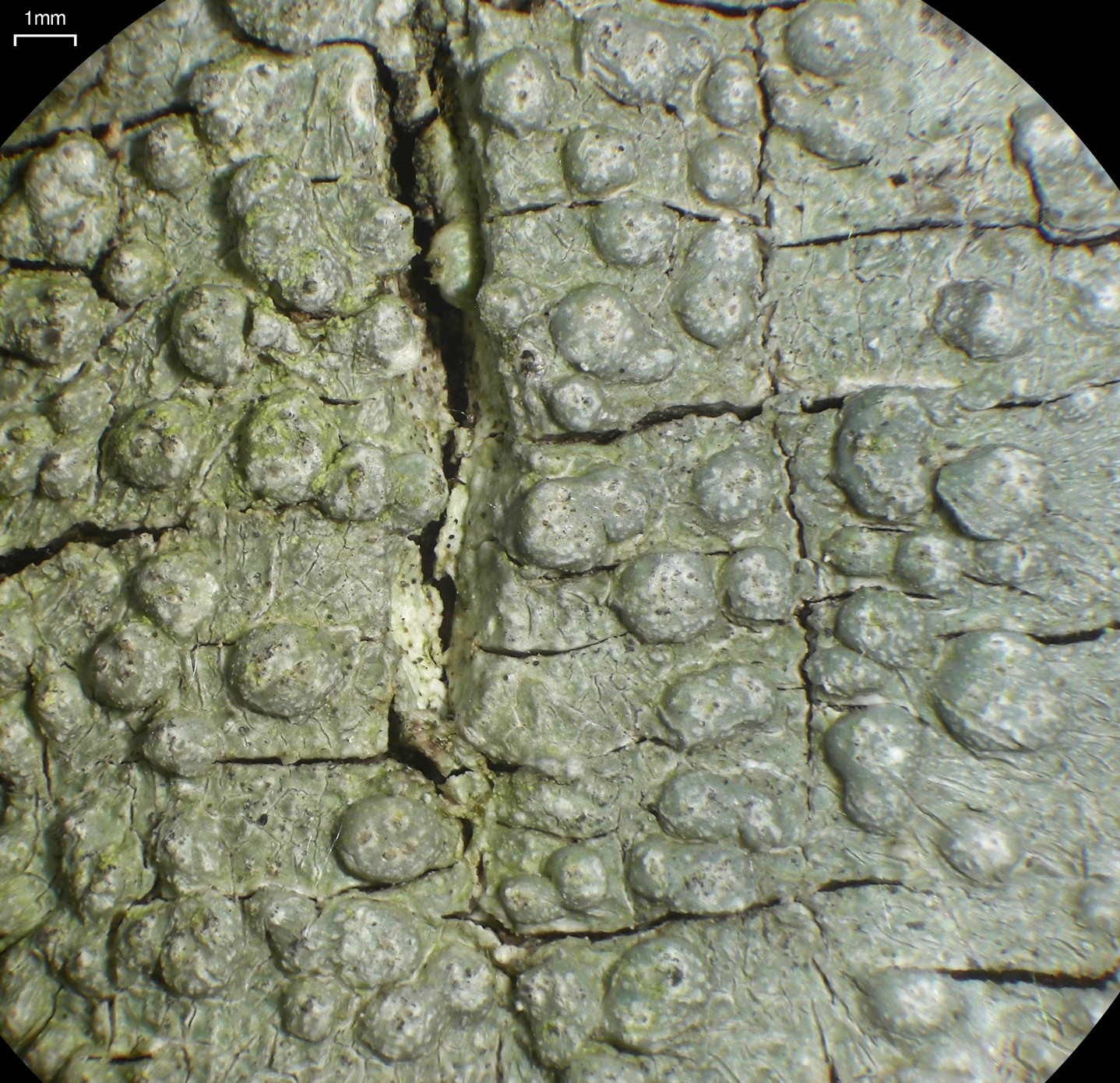
- Pertusaria paratuberculifera

Scientific classification
- Kingdom: Fungi
- Division: Ascomycota
- Class: Lecanoromycetes
- Order: Pertusariales
- Family: Pertusariaceae
- Genus: Pertusaria; DC. (1805)

Type species
- Pertusaria communis DC. (1805)

Synonyms
- Pertusariomyces E.A.Thomas ex Cif. & Tomas. (1953)

= Pertusaria =

Genus of lichens in the family Pertusariaceae

Pertusaria is a large genus of warty crustose lichens in the Pertusariaceae family. The fruiting bodies are usually modified apothecia that immersed in warts on the main body (thallus) with small holes for the spores to emerge, similar to ostioles, or are fully above and lecanorine (spore bearing discs surrounded by a ring of tissue similar to the tissue of the thallus. Members of the genus are commonly called wart lichens.

The widespread genus contains over 500 species.

Classification in the large genus relies heavily on thallus chemistry to distinguish and classify species, some of which differ only in the presence or absence of a single secondary chemical. Lichexanthone, norlichexanthone, and their chlorinated derivatives are common in this genus.

== Selected species ==
- Pertusaria amara
- Pertusaria californica
- Pertusaria diluta
- Pertusaria favicunda
- Pertusaria opthalmazia
- Pertusaria rubefacta
- Pertusaria subambigens
- Pertusaria velata
- Pertusaria xanthodes
