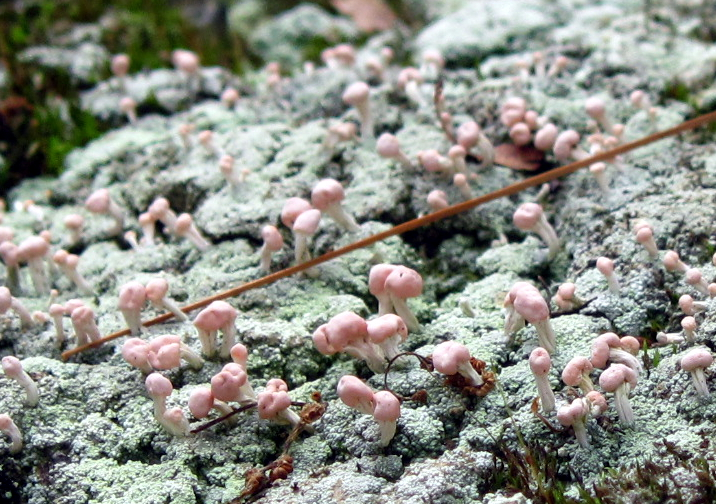

Conservation status
- Secure (NatureServe)

Scientific classification
- Kingdom: Fungi
- Division: Ascomycota
- Class: Lecanoromycetes
- Order: Pertusariales
- Family: Icmadophilaceae
- Genus: Dibaeis
- Species: D. baeomyces

Binomial name
- Dibaeis baeomyces (L.f.) Rambold & Hertel (1993)

Synonyms
- Baeomyces fungoides; Baeomyces roseus Pers. (1794); Lichen baeomyces L.f. (1782)

= Dibaeis baeomyces =

Species of fungus

Dibaeis baeomyces, commonly known as pink earth lichen, is a fruticose lichen belonging to the family Icmadophilaceae.

== Taxonomy ==
Carl Linnaeus the Younger described the pink earth lichen in his 1782 work Supplementum Plantarum as Lichen baeomyces.

The genus Dibaeis was previously considered a synonym of genus Baeomyces, until genetic testing established that the genera were separate and not even especially closely related. D. baeomyces was one of the species which had its rDNA sequenced by both the 1997 study by Stenroos and DePriest published in the American Journal of Botany, and the 1999 study by Platt and Spatafora published in The Lichenologist, which both established the genera as genetically and morphologically distinct. D. baeomyces was, however, found to belong to a clade that also includes Siphula ceratites and Thamnolia vermicularis. Baeomyces rufus, in particular, was noted as having been determined to be phylogenetically distant from D. baeomyces by Stenroos's and DePriest's analysis of genetic data. A subsequent study by Platt and Spatafora, published in the journal Mycologia in 2000, used further DNA sequencing assays to establish that "Baeomycetaceae [to which B. rufus belongs] is a distinct taxon from the Icmadophilaceae [to which D. baeomyces belongs] and the two families represent independent lichenization events."

== Description ==
D. baeomyces is characterized by bulbous pink apothecia, 1–4 mm in diameter, atop stalks no taller than 6 mm. The thallus may be grey or white, and may have a pinkish tinge.

=== Similar species ===
D. baeomyces is related to Icmadophila ericetorum, the candy lichen, and the two species superficially resemble one another. In some parts of North America where ranges overlap, both D. baeomyces and I. ericetorum are colloquially referred to as "fairy puke" lichen, leading to further confusion between the species. Its appearance is also superficially similar to some Cladonia species, particularly Cladonia cristatella (common name British soldiers), which has red tips rather than pink; and to multiple Baeomyces species, which typically have brown tips. B. rufus, as mentioned above, has pinkish bulbs atop its stalks, like D. baeomyces, but like other Baeomyces species it has been established as not being closely related to D. baeomyces.

== Distribution and habitat ==
This lichen is found throughout eastern North America, from Alabama and Georgia in the south to the Arctic Circle in the north. While rare there, it does occur in both Alaska and the Northwest Territories. It prefers to grow directly on unstable soils such as loose sand or dry clay, and in full sun. It also prefers acid soils to neutral or alkaline. On disturbed ground, a preferred habitat type, it is able to spread quickly for a lichen.
