= Siphulopsis =

Scientific classification
- Kingdom: Fungi
- Division: Ascomycota
- Class: Lecanoromycetes
- Order: Pertusariales
- Family: Icmadophilaceae
- Genus: Siphulopsis; Kantvilas & A.R.Nilsen (2020)
- Species: S. queenslandica

Binomial name
- Siphulopsis queenslandica (Kantvilas) Kantvilas & A.R.Nilsen (2020)

Synonyms
- Knightiella queenslandica Kantvilas (2018)

Genus of lichens

Siphulopsis is a single-species fungal genus in the family Icmadophilaceae. This monotypic genus the contains the fruticose lichen species Siphulopsis queenslandica, found in Australia. This lichen was originally described by Gintaras Kantvilas in 2018. He tentatively classified it in the genus Knightiella due to morphological similarities with Knightiella eucalypti (since transferred to the genus Knightiellastrum), but molecular phylogenetics revealed it to constitute a distinct lineage.

The genus name Siphulopsis combines the name Siphula, referring to a similar genus, with the Greek suffix -opsis, which denotes resemblance. This naming reflects the similarity in thallus morphology between this species and those of Siphula.

== Description ==
The species Siphulopsis queenslandica initiates its growth as small, scale-like patches (squamulose) and soon develops into shrub-like, cushioned clumps (fruticose), typically presenting a whitish to pale ashen-grey colour. This species lacks rhizines (root-like structures for attachment). Upon examination of a cross-section of the thallus, a pseudocortex can be observed. This outer layer is about 20–30 μm thick and consists of poorly differentiated, short-celled hyphae, each approximately 5 μm wide. This layer also contains sporadically interspersed dead cells of its photosynthetic partner, a unicellular green alga. The algal cells are spherical and measure between 6 and 10 μm in diameter.

Reproductive structures known as ascomata are not observed in this species. However, it possesses pycnidia, which are small, flask-shaped structures embedded within the thallus, producing bacilliform (rod-shaped) conidia, which are involved in asexual reproduction.

The chemical composition of Siphulopsis queenslandica includes thamnolic acid, a secondary metabolite common in many lichen species.

The generic description of Siphulopsis references its fruticose thallus that contains thamnolic acid, which is somewhat similar to Siphulaebut lacks rhizines and is not genetically related to this genus.
