= Gyalectaria diluta =

Scientific classification
- Kingdom: Fungi
- Division: Ascomycota
- Class: Lecanoromycetes
- Order: Pertusariales
- Family: Coccotremataceae
- Genus: Gyalectaria
- Species: G. diluta

Binomial name
- Gyalectaria diluta (C.Björk, G.Thor & T.B.Wheeler) Schmitt, T.Sprib. & Lumbsch (2010)

Synonyms
- Pertusaria diluta C.Björk, G.Thor & T.B.Wheeler (2009)

Species of lichen

Gyalectaria diluta is a species of crustose lichen in the family Coccotremataceae, first found in inland rainforests of British Columbia. This pale, crust-forming lichen grows on the bark of conifer trees in very humid old-growth forests, where it forms small patches that bleach the underlying bark to whitish or pale green-grey colours. It is found from British Columbia to Montana and Idaho, typically growing on smooth bark of young cedar saplings beneath mature forest canopies that have remained undisturbed for centuries.

== Taxonomy ==
The species was formally described in 2009 by Curtis Björk, Göran Thor and Tim Wheeler. The holotype, collected from the bark of western redcedar (Thuja plicata) in old-growth forest near St. Paul Lake, Montana, is preserved in the Canadian Museum of Nature. The epithet diluta alludes to the lichen's pale, "diluted" colour. Molecular work in 2010 demonstrated that the "gyalectoid" Pertusaria species form a clade with a sister relationship to Coccotrema and were therefore transferred to the new genus Gyalectaria in family Coccotremataceae.

Morphologically the lichen resembles several eight-spored members of Pertusaria, especially P. carneopallida, P. gyalectoides and P. jamesii. It differs from P. carneopallida in lacking gyrophoric acid (C− versus a pink C+ flash) and in having a far more pronounced perihymenial "muff". Compared with the southern-hemisphere look-alikes, G. diluta has much smaller apothecia and ascospores, and its thallus chemistry is distinct. Its gyalectoid appearance once led field workers to confuse it with other genera, but ascus structure and the presence of chlorococcoid algae prompted its original placement in Pertusaria sensu lato (an assignment overturned by later molecular work).

== Description ==
Gyalectaria diluta grows as a thin, crust-forming lichen that bleaches the underlying bark to pale green-grey or whitish tones. The crust breaks into tiny, smooth polygons (areoles only 0.2–0.3 mm across) that soon fuse into patches as large as about 6 × 2 cm. Viewed in section, the thallus is stratified: a firm outer cortex 10–40 μm thick overlies a layer of densely packed green algal cells (photobiont) 20–100 μm deep; no darker hypothallus is present. The algal partner consists of jelly-sheathed, angular cells roughly 10–14 μm wide. Standard spot tests are negative (C−), indicating the absence of gyrophoric acid; thin-layer chromatography shows an as yet unidentified substance instead.

Reproduction takes place in countless wart-like swellings (verrucae) that cover older parts of the crust at densities up to 119 per square centimetre. Each verruca usually houses a single tiny apothecium 0.20–0.36 mm in diameter whose disc is sunk below the surface, later rupturing the wart and exposing a flat to shallowly concave salmon-to-pale-yellow centre framed by the thallus itself. Around the disc lies a distinct, waxy pseudo-excipular rim up to 65 μm thick whose inner tissue stains bright blue in iodine after potassium pre-treatment, revealing starch-like compounds. The spore-bearing layer (hymenium) is 80–190 μm tall and gelatinised; eight simple, ellipsoid ascospores develop in each ascus and measure 33–37 × 17–21 μm, with walls 1–2 μm thick.

== Habitat and distribution ==
The lichen is restricted to very humid, late-successional conifer forests. It has been recorded on the bark of western hemlock (Tsuga heterophylla), western redcedar (Thuja plicata), Douglas-fir (Pseudotsuga menziesii), and occasionally on decorticated logs where it may mingle with Absconditella lignicola and Lichinodium sirosiphoideum. Although capable of colonising a range of substrates, it occurs most reliably on the smooth bark of young redcedar saplings growing beneath an old-growth canopy.

Known sites form a loose arc through the inland temperate rain-forest belt: fourteen localities in British Columbia, one in northern Idaho and one in north-western Montana. Elevations range from sea level along the rugged mid-coast to about 1,000 m (3,300 ft) in the Selkirk and Cabinet Mountains. All stands share a persistently moist microclimate and have escaped large-scale disturbance for centuries, suggesting the species is sensitive to canopy removal and prolonged drying.
