= Siphula flavovirens =

Scientific classification
- Kingdom: Fungi
- Division: Ascomycota
- Class: Lecanoromycetes
- Order: Pertusariales
- Family: Icmadophilaceae
- Genus: Siphula
- Species: S. flavovirens

Binomial name
- Siphula flavovirens Kantvilas, Zedda & Elix (2003)

Species of lichen

Siphula flavovirens is a species of terricolous (ground-dwelling) fruticose lichen in the family Icmadophilaceae. It occurs in the Succulent Karoo biome of South Africa.

== Taxonomy ==
Siphula flavovirens was described as a new species by the lichenologists Gintaras Kantvilas, Luciana Zedda, and John Elix in 2003, based on specimens collected from Namaqualand in the Northern Cape Province of South Africa. The type specimen was collected by Zedda near Soebatsfontein in the Succulent Karoo biome, at an elevation of 380 m (1,250 ft). It is deposited at PRE (holotype), the herbarium of the South African National Biodiversity Institute in Pretoria. The species epithet flavovirens alludes to its distinctive yellowish-green colouration, which resembles lichens in the genus Xanthoparmelia; this yellowish colouration is rare in the genus Siphula.

== Description ==
Siphula flavovirens is a small, fruticose lichen that typically forms dense tufts or mats about 5–9 mm tall, occasionally reaching up to 10 mm. The species is characterized by broadly flattened, fragile lobes that stand erect or ascending, often densely crowded and intertwined, and sometimes perforated with holes. Its lobes range from 0.5 to 3 mm wide and have identical dorsal and ventral surfaces. The surface texture is notably rough, scabrid, mealy, and irregularly puckered, with colours ranging from dull yellow-green to pale beige-brown, particularly near the base. The lobes lack a developed cortex and instead have an outer layer composed of loose, short-celled hyphae extending from the medulla.

Chemically, Siphula flavovirens is unique among its genus due to the presence of usnic acid and caloploicin, the latter being recorded for the first time in the genus Siphula with the publication of this species. This chemical composition distinguishes it significantly from other closely related species, particularly those within the 'Siphula decumbens group' which predominantly contain depsides such as thamnolic and hypothamnolic acids.

== Habitat and distribution ==
At the time of its original publication, Siphula flavovirens was known from two localities in South Africa: Namaqualand in the Northern Cape Province and the Gifberg area near Vanrhynsdorp in the Western Cape Province. It occurs on shallow soil among granitic and sandstone rocks, typically in sheltered microhabitats forming part of biological soil crust communities. The environments inhabited by this lichen experience low winter rainfall, extreme summer dryness, and occasional moisture from coastal fog, conditions typical of the Succulent Karoo ecoregion. The species tends to grow in sheltered locations near rock bases where water temporarily accumulates during rainfall events.
