= Coccotrema maritimum =

Conservation status
- Vulnerable (NatureServe)

Scientific classification
- Kingdom: Fungi
- Division: Ascomycota
- Class: Lecanoromycetes
- Order: Pertusariales
- Family: Coccotremataceae
- Genus: Coccotrema
- Species: C. maritimum

Binomial name
- Coccotrema maritimum Brodo (1973)

Species of lichen

Coccotrema maritimum is a crustose lichen commonly known as volcano lichen, due to the volcano-like appearance of the fruit bodies. It was first described and named by renowned Canadian lichenologist Irwin Brodo from a population on Haida Gwaii (for a brief time known as the Queen Charlotte Islands) in 1973.

== Description ==
The thallus (the main body of the lichen) is thick, rough and crusty, taking on the appearance of dry, cracked mud. It is white to pinkish or yellowish-gray in colour, and porous to allow for gas exchange. From a distance, C. maritimum can be seen on the rocks as a white line just above the surface of the water. The outer surface of C.maritimum is scattered with hemispherical nitrogen-fixing structures (cephalodia) that are pinkish to brownish–grey in colour.

=== Reproduction ===
As in other lichens, Coccotrema species can reproduce sexually by generating tiny spores. Six to eight spores can be found per ascus (a sac where spores develop). Asci are arranged in two rows with thin, smooth walls; they are initially colourless but become red-brown with age. The asci are stored in the hymenial cavity which is often slightly depressed with a pink or orange tint. Paraphyses (microscopic structures) are long, unbranched, and slender, and can be found lining pores in the hymenial cavity through which spores escape. Coccotrema maritimum lack soredia and isidia (vegetative, or sexual reproductive structures); however, they do possess pycnidia. Pycnidia are located along the summits of long wart-like projections on the surface of the lichen, and are pale red-brown fruiting bodies lined with non-motile spores. When spores are mature an opening appears at the top of these pear-shaped Pycnidia through which these spores are released.

== Habitat ==
Coccotrema maritimum are found on the upper edge of coastal rocks, just above the salt-spray zone. They can extend as far as 700m above the shoreline, and are rarely found on the vertical surfaces of highly exposed rocks. Coccotrema maritimum anchor only to rocky surfaces.

== Range ==
Coccotrema maritimum have a very limited range; they are only seen in coastal British Columbia, Canada. They are abundant on Haida Gwaii, located roughly 80 km off mainland British Columbia, north of Vancouver Island.

== Importance to humans ==
Lichens in general are important bio-indicators as they are highly sensitive to any changes in the environment; this sensitivity is a result of their reliance on atmospheric moisture and nutrients, in combination with their limited ability to rid themselves of toxins. Through observation of their physical appearance and monitoring of their chemical composition lichens are used to indicate the health of environments worldwide. Coccotrema maritimum and other species may be effective indicators of air quality and the effects of oil spills and post spill clean-up. This may be a particularly relevant usage in the Queen Charlotte Islands, as there is an increasing probability of oil and gas development between the Islands and the BC mainland.

== Importance to ecosystem ==
Lichens produce compounds that will chemically degrade rocks thereby aiding in soil formation. The soil formed is then trapped by the lichen and over time, enough accumulates to allow for the growth of additional flora and fauna on these originally bare rock surfaces. Coccotrema maritimum also contains cyanobacteria (in the cephalodia) and are therefore a nitrogen-fixing species. Because cyanobacteria trap nitrogen from the atmosphere and convert it into a form that is usable by other flora and fauna, the presence of "C. maritimum" may actually increase nitrogen availability for other plant species. Although many northern lichen species are an important winter food source for many animals, grazers do not appear to consume Coccotrema maritimum.

== Conservation ==
The Queen Charlotte Islands, also known as Gwaii Hannas, are a part of a National Park Reserve. However, Coccotrema maritimum has not yet been assessed by COSEWIC, thus their current conservation status is unknown.
