= Dibaeis yurii =

Scientific classification
- Kingdom: Fungi
- Division: Ascomycota
- Class: Lecanoromycetes
- Order: Pertusariales
- Family: Icmadophilaceae
- Genus: Dibaeis
- Species: D. yurii

Binomial name
- Dibaeis yurii (S.Y.Kondr., Lőkös, S.O.Oh & Hur) S.Y.Kondr., Lőkös & Hur (2015)

Synonyms
- Ochrolechia yurii S.Y.Kondr., Lőkös, S.O.Oh & Hur (2014)

Species of lichen

Dibaeis yurii is a little-known species of terricolous (ground-dwelling) lichen in the family Icmadophilaceae. It is found in the Russian Far East and in South Korea.

== Taxonomy ==
The lichen was formally described as new to science in 2014 by lichenologists Sergey Kondratyuk, Laszlo Lőkös, Soon-Ok Oh, and Jae-Seoun Hur. The type specimen was collected from the soil of a side road along the Razdolnoe-Khasan road (Khasansky District, Primorsky Krai). The species epithet yurii honours Yury Kondratyuk from Vladivostok, who helped the authors with lichen collections in Primorsky.

The authors originally classified the species in genus Ochrolechia. The next year they transferred it to Dibaeis after they sequenced some specimens and molecular phylogenetics analysis showed it to be a member of that genus.

== Description ==
The dull greyish to brownish grey thallus of Dibaeis yurii reaches sizes of up to several centimetres across. Prominent on the thallus surface are the grape-like clusters of whitish-grey soralia, which become uplifted above the thallus surface, and reach a size of up to 3.5 mm in diameter. The individual soredia are grain-like, measuring typically measuring 40–60 μm in diameter. There is no distinct hypothallus. Apothecia have not been observed in this species.

All of the standard chemical spot tests on the thallus of Dibaeis yurii are negative: K−, C−, KC−, P−. However, both the medulla and the soredial clusters are reactive: K+ (yellow), KC+ (orange), C+ (yellow), P+ (orange), UV+ (bright orange).

A somewhat similar species is Ochrolechia inaequatula, found in Asia, Europe, Greenland, and North America, where it inhabits coastal cliff tops and mountains, growing on the ground in close association with or encrusting mosses, Cladonia species, and plant detritus. They are distinguished by differences in the soredial structures and by spot test reactions.

== Habitat and distribution ==
Dibaeis yurii is found in the Khasansky district of Primorsky region of the Russian Far East, and from Chuja-do Island in South Korea. Associated lichens are Diploschistes cf. muscorum and species of Cladonia.
