= Catillaria japonica =

Scientific classification
- Kingdom: Fungi
- Division: Ascomycota
- Class: Lecanoromycetes
- Order: Lecanorales
- Family: Catillariaceae
- Genus: Catillaria
- Species: C. japonica

Binomial name
- Catillaria japonica Zhurb. & Hafellner (2020)
- Holotype: Shiiba Research Forest, Kyushu University, Japan

Species of lichen-dwelling fungus

Catillaria japonica is a species of lichenicolous (lichen-dwelling) ascomycete fungus in the family Catillariaceae. The fungus produces small blackish fruiting bodies up to 0.6 mm across on the surface of its host lichens, with reddish-brown internal pigments that are unusual for the genus Catillaria. It grows specifically on soil- or wood-inhabiting baeomycetoid lichens, particularly species of Dibaeis and Pseudobaeomyces, in cool- to warm-temperate montane forests. The species is known only from Japan, where it has been recorded from Hokkaido, Honshu, Kyushu, and Yakushima Island at elevations typically between 500 and 1,600 m.

== Taxonomy ==
Catillaria japonica was described as a new species in 2020 by Mikhail Zhurbenko and Josef Hafellner during a study of fungi associated with baeomycetoid lichens. The type material was collected in the Shiiba Research Forest (Miyazaki Prefecture, Kyushu, Japan) at about 1,140 m elevation, where the fungus grows on the thallus of Dibaeis sorediata. It was placed in Catillaria on account of its Catillaria-type asci, small ascospores with zero or one septum, and apothecial structure, even though its reddish-brown pigmentation and lichenicolous habit are unusual for the genus. It differs from the similar lichenicolous species Catillaria stereocaulorum in having more frequently branched and anastomosing paraphyses without dark apical caps, a medium reddish-brown hypothecium, and a preference for species of Dibaeis and Pseudobaeomyces rather than Stereocaulon as hosts.

== Description ==
The species forms small, blackish, non-pruinose fruiting bodies (apothecia) that sit on the host thallus as discoid structures 0.15–0.6 mm in diameter, with a flat to slightly convex disc surrounded by a usually persistent, slightly raised margin and often a short stipe embedded in the host tissue. The exciple, hypothecium and epihymenium are medium to dark reddish brown, and their pigments give a weakly fading reaction in potassium hydroxide solution and turn reddish to orange with nitric acid; the hymenium is hyaline to dull red, penetrated by a gel that stains strongly blue in iodine. Paraphyses are slender, septate filaments 1–2 μm thick that become more richly branched and anastomosed toward the apex, where the tips are only slightly swollen and lack the dark caps typical of many Catillaria species. Asci are 8-spored, somewhat club-shaped (clavate) and of the Catillaria type, with a thickened tholus but no sharply delimited apical apparatus, and contain mostly ellipsoid to narrowly ellipsoid or narrowly obovoid ascospores typically 10.5–13 × 4.5–6 μm that are hyaline, occasionally faintly brownish, usually 0–1-septate (rarely with 2–3 septa), only slightly constricted at the median septum, and have smooth, non-halonate walls about 0.5 μm thick. An asexual morph has not been firmly linked to the species, although minute semi-immersed pycnidia with a greenish-grey wall and short bacilliform hyaline conidia were observed on the apothecial discs in one collection.

== Habitat and distribution ==
Catillaria japonica is an obligately lichenicolous fungus known only from Japan, where it has been recorded from Hokkaido, Honshu, Kyushu and Yakushima Island. It grows on the thalli of soil- or wood-inhabiting baeomycetoid lichens, mainly Dibaeis arcuata and D. sorediata as well as undetermined Dibaeis species, and less frequently on Pseudobaeomyces pachycarpus; in one locality the host Dibaeis thallus was itself growing on a fallen Tsuga diversifolia log. The species has been found in cool- to warm-temperate montane habitats, typically between about 500 and 1,600 m elevation, in open or forested sites where the host lichens form patches on soil or rotten wood. It does not appear to cause conspicuous damage or gall formation in the host thalli.
