= Siphulella =

Scientific classification
- Kingdom: Fungi
- Division: Ascomycota
- Class: Lecanoromycetes
- Order: Pertusariales
- Family: Icmadophilaceae
- Genus: Siphulella; Kantvilas, Elix & P.James (1992)
- Species: S. coralloidea

Binomial name
- Siphulella coralloidea Kantvilas, Elix & P.James (1992)

Single-species lichen genus

Siphulella is a fungal genus in the family Icmadophilaceae. The genus is monotypic, containing the single lichen species Siphulella coralloidea, found in southwest Tasmania. The genus and species were described as new to science in 1992 by Gintaras Kantvilas, John Elix and Peter James. The genus name is based on the superficial resemblance that S. coralloidea has to some species in the genus Siphula.
