= Gyalectaria =

Scientific classification
- Domain: Eukaryota
- Kingdom: Fungi
- Division: Ascomycota
- Class: Lecanoromycetes
- Order: Pertusariales
- Family: Coccotremataceae
- Genus: Gyalectaria; I.Schmitt, Kalb & Lumbsch (2010)

Type species
- Gyalectaria jamesii (Kantvilas) I.Schmitt, Kalb & Lumbsch (2010)

Species
- G. diluta G. gyalectoides G. jamesii

Genus of lichen

Gyalectaria is a genus of crustose lichens in the family Coccotremataceae. It has three species. The genus was circumscribed in 2010 by Imke Schmitt, Klaus Kalb and Helge Thorsten Lumbsch, with G. jamesii assigned as the type species. The three species transferred to the genus were originally placed in the large genus Pertusaria. Molecular phylogenetics showed that they belong to a lineage distinct from and unrelated to that genus, but with a sister group relationship to the genus Coccotrema. The genus name combines Gyalect- (referring to the morphologically similar genus Gyalecta) and -aria, taken from the generic name Pertusaria.

== Species ==
- Gyalectaria diluta (Björk, G.Thor & T.B.Wheeler) I.Schmitt, T.Sprib. & Lumbsch (2010)
- Gyalectaria gyalectoides (Vězda) I.Schmitt, Kalb & Lumbsch (2010)
- Gyalectaria jamesii (Kantvilas) I.Schmitt, Kalb & Lumbsch (2010)
