= Knightiellastrum =

Scientific classification
- Kingdom: Fungi
- Division: Ascomycota
- Class: Lecanoromycetes
- Order: Pertusariales
- Family: Icmadophilaceae
- Genus: Knightiellastrum; L.Ludw. & Kantvilas (2020)
- Species: K. eucalypti

Binomial name
- Knightiellastrum eucalypti (Kantvilas) L.Ludw. & Kantvilas (2020)
- Holotype: Hartz Road, Tasmania, Australia

Synonyms
- Icmadophila eucalypti Kantvilas (2011); Knightiella eucalypti (Kantvilas) Kantvilas (2018)

Genus of lichens

Knightiellastrum is a single-species fungal genus in the family Icmadophilaceae. This monotypic genus the contains the corticolous (bark-dwelling), squamulose lichen species Knightiellastrum eucalypti, found in Tasmania, Australia.

== Taxonomy ==
This lichen was originally described by Gintaras Kantvilas in 2011. It was first identified from specimens collected in Tasmania, Australia, where it was found on the moist trunks of old Eucalyptus obliqua trees in mixed forests. The type specimen was collected by Kantvilas along Hartz Road near the entrance to the Hartz Mountains National Park, and is stored at the Tasmanian Herbarium with duplicates at the British Museum.

Kantvilas provisionally classified the species in Icmadophila. This genus is characterised by a crustose to squamulose thallus that contains thamnolic acid and hosts a Coccomyxa-type photobiont. The genus is typically recognized for its sessile to stipitate fruiting bodies and Icmadophila-type asci. The original classification of Icmadophila eucalypti within this genus was based on its morphological, anatomical, ecological, and chemical features, although, as explained by Kantvilas, this placement was provisional due to unsuccessful attempts to confirm its taxonomy through DNA analysis. Further uncertainty regarding the generic placement was added by the absence of apothecia.

Subsequent molecular phylogenetics analysis suggested that this Tasmanian endemic species does not align closely with Icmadophila. Instead, it shares closer ties with the genera Thamnolia and Knightiella, and is distantly related to Icmadophila. As a result, the species was reclassified in 2018 by Kantvilas as Knightiella eucalypti. This reassignment was supported by similar morphological traits and ecological niches between Knightiella eucalypti and other species within Knightiella, alongside their shared geographical distribution.

Further phylogenetic analyses using internal transcribed spacer (ITS) and nuclear large subunit ribosomal RNA gene (nuLSU) gene sequences clarified the taxonomic position of Icmadophila eucalypti, leading to its reclassification into the new genus Knightiellastrum. These studies revealed that Icmadophila, as previously understood, was not a monophyletic group. Icmadophila eucalypti, now referred to as Knightiellastrum eucalypti, and Icmadophila splachnirima (renamed to Knightiella splachnirima) are distantly related to each other and also to the core Icmadophila species, which include I. ericetorum, I. aversa, and I. japonica. The separation was strongly supported by Bayesian inference, showing Knightiellastrum eucalypti as sister to a large clade containing traditional Icmadophila species and other related genera. This restructuring reflects significant phylogenetic distinctions warranting a new genus, confirming earlier provisional assignments based solely on non-molecular characteristics.

=== Etymology ===
The species name, eucalypti, reflects the lichen's common association with eucalyptus trees. The genus name Knightiellastrum combines Knightiella with the Latin suffix -astrum, suggesting a partial resemblance. This designation reflects that the thallus morphology of the type species vaguely echoes that of a smaller, infertile Knightiella splachnirima.

== Description ==
The thallus of Knightiellastrum eucalypti is squamulose, showing colours ranging from whitish to pale grey, and occasionally with hints of pale bluish, creamish, or beige. It forms expansive, irregular colonies that can reach up to 50 cm (20 in) in width. The individual squamules vary in size from 1 to 5 mm across, and have an uneven thickness between 130 and 350 μm. These squamules are densely packed with crystals that shine under polarised light and dissolve in a solution of potassium hydroxide (KOH).

The squamules emerge from a diffuse, very thin, and ephemeral primary thallus that appears white. They are scattered and discrete or overlapping, rarely merging into each other. The shapes of the squamules are notably diverse, ranging from stellate and rosette-like forms to flabellate arrangements. Typically, one side of the squamule adheres closely to the substrate while the other side ascends. The edges are initially finely toothed and somewhat thickened, but they soon develop nodules, small lobes, or palmate lobes and become slightly shrubby (subfruticulose) in appearance. The upper surface of the squamules is matt, smooth, or minutely rough, featuring a pseudocortex made up of randomly oriented, short hyphae measuring 3–5 μm wide, interspersed with occasional dead algal cells.

The lower surface is white and lacks a cortical layer (ecorticate). Soredia, which are coarse granular structures about 40–80 μm in diameter and the same colour as the thallus, emerge along the margins of the squamules. These soredia begin to erode the margins and spread across the upper surface.

The photobiont of Knightiellastrum eucalypti is a unicellular green alga, which forms spherical cells between 5 and 11 μm in diameter. The lichen does not have ascomata or pycnidia, suggesting a primary method of reproduction and dispersal through soredia. The secondary chemistry is characterised by the presence of thamnolic acid. Chemical tests on the thallus show a vivid yellow reaction with potassium hydroxide (K+), orange with paraphenylenediamine (P+), and no reaction with calcium hypochlorite (C−) or ultraviolet light (UV−).

== Habitat and distribution ==
Knightiellastrum eucalypti is found across Tasmania, thriving in both wet eucalypt rainforests and cool temperate rainforests. This species is adaptable, ranging from lowland to subalpine elevations. It predominantly inhabits the lower, shaded sections of the trunks of very large trees, particularly those with thick, fibrous bark. The lichen most commonly grows on Eucalyptus obliqua, a species prevalent in many of Tasmania's wet eucalypt forest ecosystems. Occasionally, it is also found on the fire-sensitive rainforest conifer Athrotaxis selaginoides.

Knightiellastrum eucalypti typically forms extensive colonies on the moister sides of these trees, often in the company of other lichens that share a similar squamulose growth form, such as Cladonia rigida, Neophyllis melacarpa, and Cladia schizopora. Its preference for very old trees indicates its potential utility as an indicator of ancient forest presence, which could be valuable in ecological and conservation studies.
