= Endocena =

Scientific classification
- Kingdom: Fungi
- Division: Ascomycota
- Class: Lecanoromycetes
- Order: Pertusariales
- Family: Icmadophilaceae
- Genus: Endocena; Cromb. (1876)

Type species
- Endocena informis Cromb. (1876)

Species
- E. buckii E. informis

Synonyms
- Chirleja Lendemer & B.P.Hodk. (2012)

Genus of lichens

Endocena is a genus of lichen-forming fungi in the family Icmadophilaceae. It has two species. Endocena is characterised by a thallus that can range from crustose to somewhat fruticose, with features such as hollow pustules, pseudopodetia, and granular phyllocladia. Apothecia, or sexual fruiting bodies, are rare and poorly developed. The three taxa within the genus have distinct distributional ranges, with Endocena informis var. informis being widely distributed in southern South America, while Endocena informis var. falklandica is common in the Falkland Islands, and Endocena buckii has a restricted range in Chilean Tierra del Fuego.

== Taxonomy ==
The genus Endocena was established by the Scottish lichenologist James Mascall Morrison Crombie in 1876, based on a specimen collected on the west coast of Chile. The type species, Endocena informis, was distinguished from Siphula by its hollow thallus structure. Crombie included this single species in the genus and highlighted its similarities to Siphula while noting the key difference of a hollow thallus. This relationship and the genus's placement within the family Icmadophilaceae were later confirmed by Soili Stenroos and colleagues in 2002.

In examining the extensive lichen collections from southern South America, several collections from the Falkland Islands and Isla de los Estados were found to resemble E. informis but differed in being sorediate and having a thallus composed of flat to convex areoles. These collections were chemically similar to E. informis, both containing thamnolic acid. Further molecular studies aimed to confirm the placement of this new sorediate taxon within Endocena, revealing that both it and E. informis were congeneric with the recently proposed genus Chirleja. This new taxon was morphologically distinct but genetically similar, leading to the proposal to synonymise Chirleja under Endocena.

Molecular data, including ITS and mitochondrial small subunit sequences, showed that members of Endocena and Chirleja form a supported monophyletic group within the Icmadophilaceae. Despite the genetic uniformity, significant morphological differences were observed among the taxa, leading to the recognition of distinct species and varieties within the genus. As a result, the genus Chirleja was synonymised under Endocena, with Endocena buckii (formerly Chirleja buckii) and Endocena informis var. falklandica (a sorediate taxon from the Falkland Islands) being formally recognised.

== Description ==
The genus Endocena features a thallus that can range from crustose (crust-like) to subfruticose (somewhat shrub-like), composed of hollow pustules or pseudopodetia (stalk-like structures), or solid pseudopodetia with granular phyllocladia (leaf-like structures) on a thin primary thallus in one species. The thallus may or may not have soredia (powdery reproductive structures). Sporodochia (asexual spore-producing structures) are present in one species.

Apothecia (sexual fruiting bodies) are very rare, poorly developed, sessile (attached directly without a stalk), up to 2 mm in diameter, with irregular, strongly concave discs and flexuose (wavy) margins. The disc is pale pink-buff and no functional hymenium (spore-producing tissue) has been observed.

Chemically, Endocena contains thamnolic acid, as identified by thin-layer chromatography. Apothecia have been reported from four collections, two from E. informis var. falklandica and two from E. informis var. informis. The apothecia start as thalline warts with a white, granular surface that expands and becomes pinkish as the white granules disperse, eventually revealing the apothecium disc.

== Habitat and distribution ==
Endocena includes three taxa with distinct distributional ranges. Endocena informis var. informis is widely distributed throughout southern South America, from the Falkland Islands and Isla de los Estados to the southern regions of Chile, extending as far north as Región de los Lagos (42°S). It is rarely reported from Argentina, with only a few historical records. Despite this, it is frequently collected on Isla de los Estados and southern Isla Grande de Tierra del Fuego.

Endocena informis var. falklandica is common in the Falkland Islands but less frequent in Tierra del Fuego, known from only two collections in Chile. Endocena buckii has an even more restricted range, with a single known collection from Seno Agostini in Chilean Tierra del Fuego.

There is a dubious report of E. informis from Macquarie Island, Australia, which lacks supporting herbarium specimens and is likely a misidentification of a similar species. The ecological preferences of these taxa vary, with both varieties of E. informis being terricolous and primarily found in open heathland. Variety informis typically grows among bryophytes, while var. falklandica is more frequent on soil and peat. The single collection of E. buckii was from the underside of a tree in a wet Nothofagus forest, though it may also inhabit soil-based environments.

== Species ==
- Endocena buckii (Lendemer & B.P.Hodk.) I.Schmitt, Fryday & Pérez-Ort. (2017)
- Endocena informis Cromb. (1876)
