= Parasiphula =

Scientific classification
- Domain: Eukaryota
- Kingdom: Fungi
- Division: Ascomycota
- Class: Lecanoromycetes
- Order: Pertusariales
- Family: Coccotremataceae
- Genus: Parasiphula; Kantvilas & Grube (2006)

Type species
- Parasiphula fragilis (Hook. f. & Taylor) Kantvilas & Grube (2006)

Species
- P. comata P. complanata P. elixii P. foliacea P. fragilis P. georginae P. jamesii

Genus of lichen

Parasiphula is a genus of crustose lichens in the family Coccotremataceae. The genus was circumscribed by Gintaras Kantvilas and Martin Grube in 2006, and contains seven species that are known from cool to cold latitudes in the Southern Hemisphere.

== Species ==
- Parasiphula comata (Nyl.) Kantvilas & Grube (2006)
- Parasiphula complanata (Hook.f. & Taylor) Kantvilas & Grube (2006)
- Parasiphula elixii (Kantvilas) Kantvilas & Grube (2006)
- Parasiphula foliacea (D.J.Galloway) Kantvilas & Grube (2006)
- Parasiphula fragilis (Hook.f. & Taylor) Kantvilas & Grube (2006)
- Parasiphula georginae (Kantvilas) Kantvilas & Grube (2006)
- Parasiphula jamesii (Kantvilas) Kantvilas & Grube (2006)
