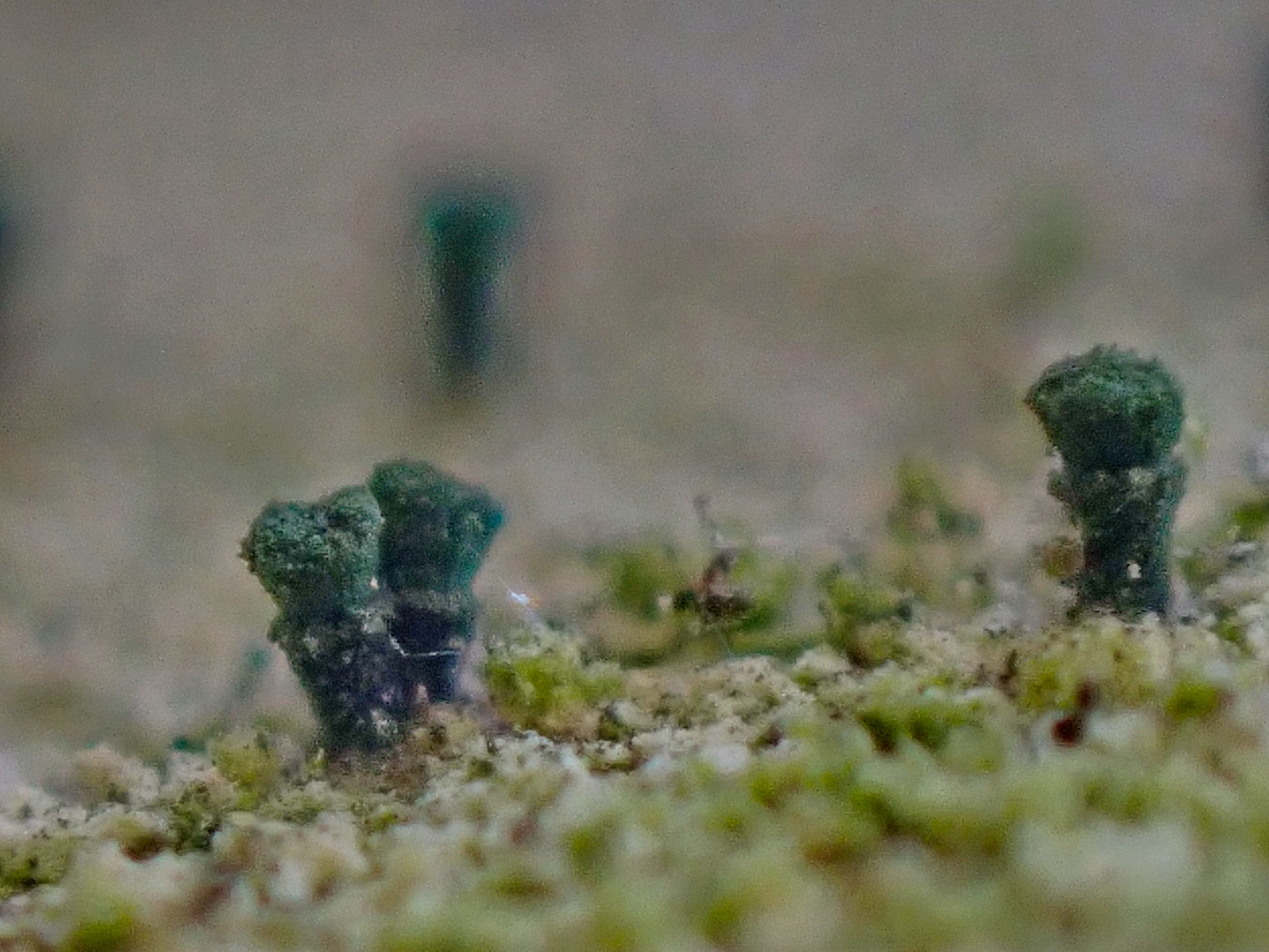
- Microcalicium disseminatum

Scientific classification
- Kingdom: Fungi
- Division: Ascomycota
- Class: Lecanoromycetes
- Order: Pertusariales
- Family: Microcaliciaceae; Tibell (1984)
- Genus: Microcalicium; Vain. (1927)

Type species
- Microcalicium disseminatum (Ach.) Vain. (1927)

= Microcalicium =

Family of fungi

Microcalicium is a genus of lichen-forming fungi in the order Pertusariales. It is the only genus in the monotypic family Microcaliciaceae. These taxa were circumscribed by the Finnish lichenologist Edvard August Vainio in 1927, with Microcalicium disseminatum assigned as the type species.

== Description ==
Species of Microcalicium have a mazaediate ascomata (an irregularly spherical fruiting body in which ascus walls break down to leave a dry, loose, amorphous, powdery, often dark, mass of spores together with disintegrating asci and paraphyses). Their asci are ellipsoid in shape and non-amyloid.

== Species ==
As of May 2024, Species Fungorum accepts the following five species in the genus Microcalicium:

- Microcalicium ahlneri Tibell (1978)
- Microcalicium arenarium (Hampe ex A.Massal.) Tibell (1978)
- Microcalicium conversum Tibell (1978)
- Microcalicium disseminatum (Ach.) Vain. (1927)
- Microcalicium loraasii Holien & Frisch (2022)
