= Miltidea =

Scientific classification
- Kingdom: Fungi
- Division: Ascomycota
- Class: Lecanoromycetes
- Order: Pertusariales
- Family: Agyriaceae
- Genus: Miltidea; Stirt. (1898)
- Species: M. ceroplasta

Binomial name
- Miltidea ceroplasta (C.Bab.) D.J.Galloway & Hafellner (1984)

Synonyms
- Biatora ceroplasta C.Bab. (1855); Lecidea ceroplasta (C.Bab.) Hook.f. (1867); Patellaria ceroplasta (C.Bab.) Müll.Arg. (1894); Bacidia ceroplasta (C.Bab.) Hellb. (1896)

Single-species lichen genus

Miltidea is a fungal genus in the family Agyriaceae. It comprises the single species Miltidea ceroplasta, a crustose lichen. Originally proposed in 1898 to encompass a wide array of red-fruited lichens, the genus was later found to be based on a fundamentally flawed concept, and was resurrected in 1984 by Josef Hafellner with a much narrower circumscription limited to just a single species. This species occurs in the cool temperate rainforests of Tasmania, New Zealand, and Chile, where it grows primarily on the smooth bark of rainforest trees at lower elevations. The lichen is distinguished by its combination of a thin, pale thallus and small but conspicuous waxy fruiting bodies that range from orange to vivid red. Molecular phylogenetic studies indicate that Miltidea represents a distinct lineage now placed in the family Agyriaceae.

== Taxonomy ==
Genus Miltidea was erected by James Stirton in 1898 as a new grouping for lichens with conspicuously red to rubescent apothecia (the disc-like fruiting bodies). He framed the genus to be "conformable" with Lecidea and treated Lecidea rubricatula as the representative type of the group. The distinctive character, as he saw it, was an internal cup-like "perithecium" surrounding the hymenium, built from vertical, rod-like elements ("staffs") set perpendicular to the thallus surface. These rods were most sharply defined in the lower zone, which he named the hypoperithecium, and commonly showed strong yellow, orange or red pigmentation at their ends; by contrast, the structure lacked a gelatinous (iodine-positive) reaction but was rich in chrysophanic acid. Stirton also noted that in some species the upper ends of the rods were faintly reddened, an observation that had earlier led him to misinterpret that layer as the hypothecium.

Crucially for his circumscription, Stirton downplayed ascospore architecture: within Miltidea he included species whose spores ranged from simple and colourless to loculate and fully muriform, arguing that such variation, even within a single apothecium, did not justify segregate genera. To make the point he contrasted forms allied to Lecanora punicea (now Haematomma puniceum) and described a Queensland specimen in which some asci bore simple loculate spores while others in the same disc held muriform ones. He then enumerated a broad assemblage under Miltidea, including taxa he called M. cinnabarina, M. russula, M. domingensis and M. vulpina, along with several New Zealand species he named (e.g., M. venusta, M. venustula and M. consanguinea). He even proposed a subsection, Cyanoysis, for forms in which the hypoperithecial rods were tipped deep blue. This expansive, pigment- and tissue-architecture-centred concept bears little resemblance to today's much narrower usage of the name, now applied to a very different, monospecific genus (Miltidea ceroplasta). The genus was resurrected by Josef Hafellner in 1984, who classified it in the monogeneric family Miltideaceae.

Molecular phylogenetic analyses by Schmitt and colleagues (2012) positioned Miltidea ceroplasta as sister to Agyrium rufum within a distinct lineage separate from Pertusariaceae. This supported recognition of Miltidea as representing an independent family-level branch (Miltideaceae) within the order Pertusariales. In 2018, using a molecular phylogenetic approach coupled with a technique known as "temporal banding", Kraichak and colleagues proposed to fold the family Miltideaceae into the Agyriaceae. A close genetic relationship between these two families had previously been noted. The proposal to subsume Miltideaceae into the Agyriaceae was accepted in a later critical analysis of the temporal banding technique for fungal and lichen systematics, and this change has subsequently been followed in the "2024 Outline of Fungi and fungus-like taxa".

== Description ==
Miltidea ceroplasta is a crustose lichen distinguished by its bright, waxy fruiting bodies and smooth thallus. The thallus is thin, pale grey to white or cream, and forms a continuous film on smooth bark. Its reproductive structures are prominent: the apothecia are convex to somewhat globular and can reach up to 2 mm in diameter, with considerable colour variations from orange-brown or yellow-orange to vivid red. Younger apothecia are often dot-like and react K+ (crimson), gradually becoming orange-brown with age. Fully mature discs may appear orange-brown or deep red and contain red anthraquinone pigments that react crimson in potassium hydroxide. The apothecia are biatorine in form (lacking a distinct thalline margin) and contain eight ascospores per ascus within a strongly amyloid layer of jelly.

Microscopically, the asci are surrounded by amyloid jelly and contain simple, hyaline, one-celled spores that are ellipsoid to slightly elongate, measuring about 17–25 × 7–12 μm in the main type material. Smaller, secondary spores (from smaller apothecia) range from 9.5 to 13 × 3.5–5 μm. The paraphyses are simple, sparingly branched, and contain oil bodies. The species also produces internal anthraquinone pigments, which give its apothecia their diagnostic K+ (crimson) reaction.

== Habitat and distribution ==
Miltidea ceroplasta occurs in Australia (Tasmania), New Zealand, and Chile. In the field in Tasmania, Miltidea ceroplasta is typically encountered in moist, shaded rainforest habitats, particularly on smooth bark of trees such as Nothofagus, Eucryphia, Anodopetalum, Phyllocladus, and Pittosporum. It occurs on lower trunks and branches rather than in the canopy and forms a common component of Tasmanian rainforest bark-dwelling lichen communities.
