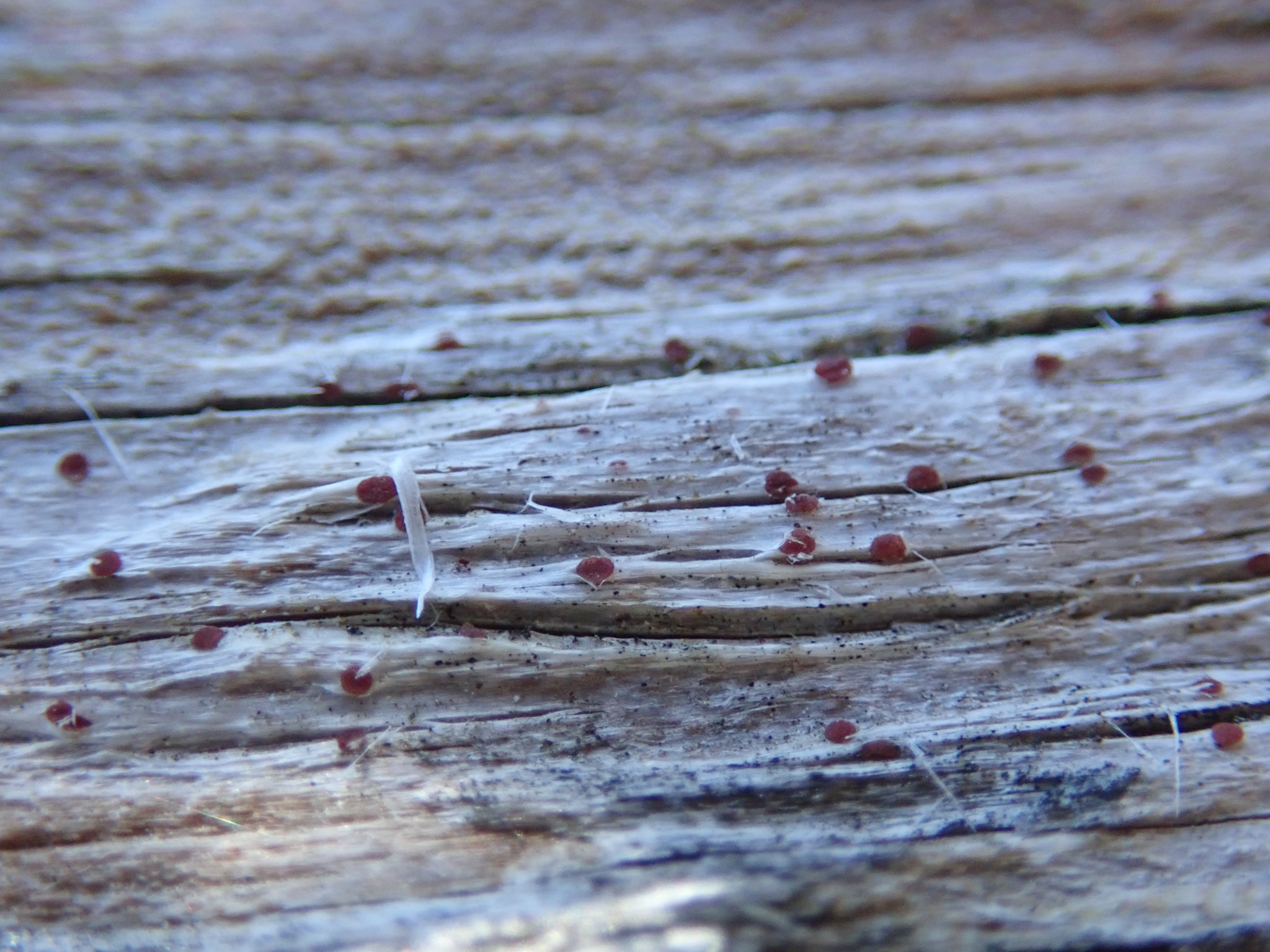
- Agyrium rufum

Scientific classification
- Kingdom: Fungi
- Division: Ascomycota
- Class: Lecanoromycetes
- Order: Pertusariales
- Family: Agyriaceae; Corda (1838)

Type genus
- Agyrium Fr. (1822)

Genera
- Agyrium; Miltidea

Synonyms
- Miltideaceae Hafellner (1984)

= Agyriaceae =

Family of lichen-forming fungi

The Agyriaceae are a family of lichenized fungi in the order Pertusariales. It contains two genera: Agyrium, and Miltidea. The family was circumscribed by August Carl Joseph Corda in 1838.

In 2018, using a molecular phylogenetic approach coupled with a technique known as "temporal banding", Kraichak and colleagues proposed to fold the family Miltideaceae into the Agyriaceae. A close genetic relationship between these two families had previously been noted. The proposal to subsume Miltideaceae into the Agyriaceae was accepted in a later critical analysis of the temporal banding technique for fungal classification.
