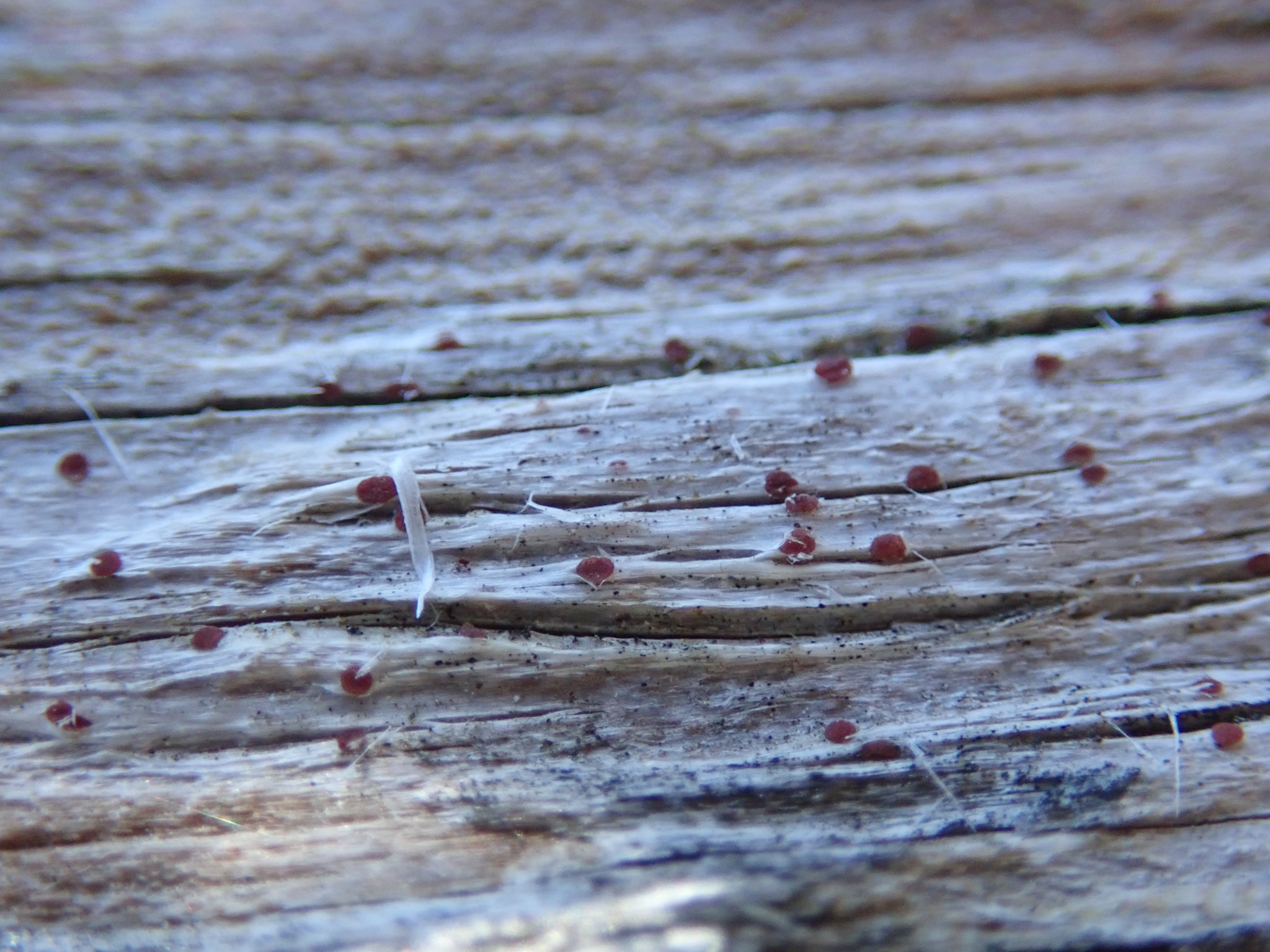
- Agyrium rufum

Scientific classification
- Kingdom: Fungi
- Division: Ascomycota
- Class: Lecanoromycetes
- Order: Pertusariales
- Family: Agyriaceae
- Genus: Agyrium; Fr. (1822)

Type species
- Agyrium rufum (Pers.) Fr. (1822)

Species
- A. aurantium A. rufum

Synonyms
- Agyrium Fr. (1821); Exogone Henn. (1908); Myxomphalos Wallr. (1833)

= Agyrium =

Genus of fungi

Agyrium is a genus of saprophytic fungi in the family Agyriaceae. It probably evolved from a lichen ancestor, as it is closely related to many lichenized species of fungi.

== Taxonomy ==
Agyrium was first proposed by Elias Magnus Fries in his 1821 work Systema Mycologicum, although the name was not published validly as a type species was not indicated; Fries published the name validly a year later in the second volume of the same work. The species Agyrium rufum was assigned as the type by Frederic Clements and Cornelius Lott Shear in 1931.

== Description ==
Characteristics of genus Agyrium include the following: a poorly developed thallus that is immersed in its substrate; ascomata in the form of an apothecium with a reduced ring-shaped exciple (the layer surrounding the hymenium that sometimes develops into a distinct margin); paraphyses that are highly branched; and ascospores that are ellipsoid and thin-walled.

The mycelia of Agyrium fungi, although not strictly lichenised, are associated with and sometimes penetrate green algae – particularly near the apothecia. This is a condition that has been described as "facultative parasitism".

== Species ==
As of May 2021, Species Fungorum accepts two species of Agyrium.

- Agyrium aurantium W.Y.Zhuang & Zhu L.Yang (2006)
- Agyrium rufum (Pers.) Fr. (1822)

The type species, Agyrium rufum, has a largely Northern Hemisphere distribution and occurs widely in Europe, although it has also been recorded in Tasmania. Agyrium aurantium occurs in China.

Although 46 taxa have been placed in Agyrium since its inception, many of them were described more than a century ago and have not been investigated with modern molecular techniques. Several of them have since been transferred to other genera. For example:

- Agyrium caesium Fr. (1822) = Puttea caesia
- Agyrium densum Fuckel (1871) = Mellitiosporiella densa
- Agyrium flavescens Rehm (1903) = Skyttella mulleri
- Agyrium nigricans Fr. (1822) = Platygloea nigricans
- Agyrium nitidum Lib. (1834) = Agyriella nitida
- Agyrium phragmiticola Hansf. (1946) = Neottiosporina phragmiticola
- Agyrium solidaginis (Ces.) De Not. (1863) = Ploettnera solidaginis
- Agyrium vulpinum (Tul.) H.Olivier = Phacopsis vulpina
