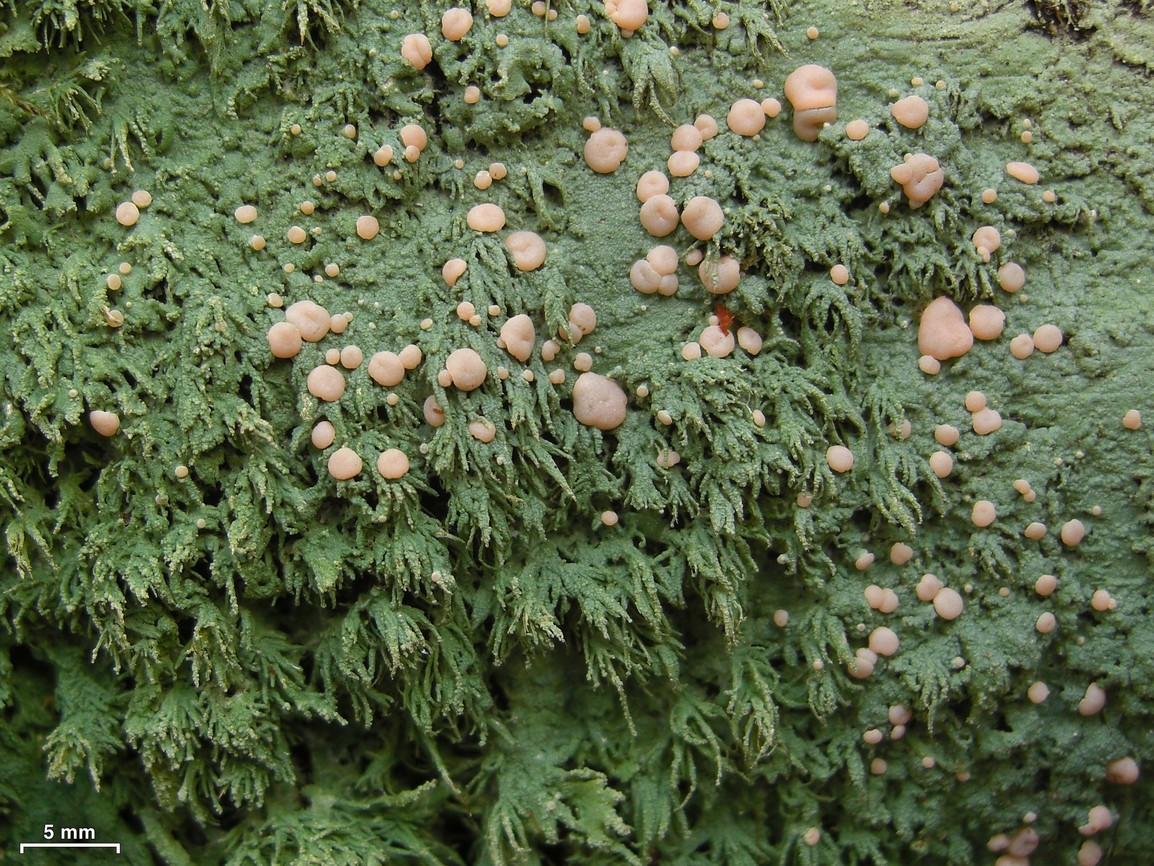

Conservation status
- Secure (NatureServe)

Scientific classification
- Kingdom: Fungi
- Division: Ascomycota
- Class: Lecanoromycetes
- Order: Pertusariales
- Family: Icmadophilaceae
- Genus: Icmadophila
- Species: I. ericetorum

Binomial name
- Icmadophila ericetorum (L.) Zahlbr. (1895)

= Icmadophila ericetorum =

Species of lichen-forming fungus

Icmadophila ericetorum is a species of lichen belonging to the family Icmadophilaceae.

It has a cosmopolitan distribution.

== See also ==
- List of lichens named by Carl Linnaeus
