= Pseudobaeomyces =

Scientific classification
- Kingdom: Fungi
- Division: Ascomycota
- Class: Lecanoromycetes
- Order: Pertusariales
- Family: Icmadophilaceae
- Genus: Pseudobaeomyces; M.Satô (1940)

Type species
- Pseudobaeomyces insignis (Zahlbr.) M.Satô 1940

Synonyms
- Baeomyces insignis Zahlbr. (1932)

Genus of lichen

Pseudobaeomyces is a genus of lichenized fungi in the Icmadophilaceae family. It is monotypic, containing the single species Pseudobaeomyces insignis, found in Asia.
