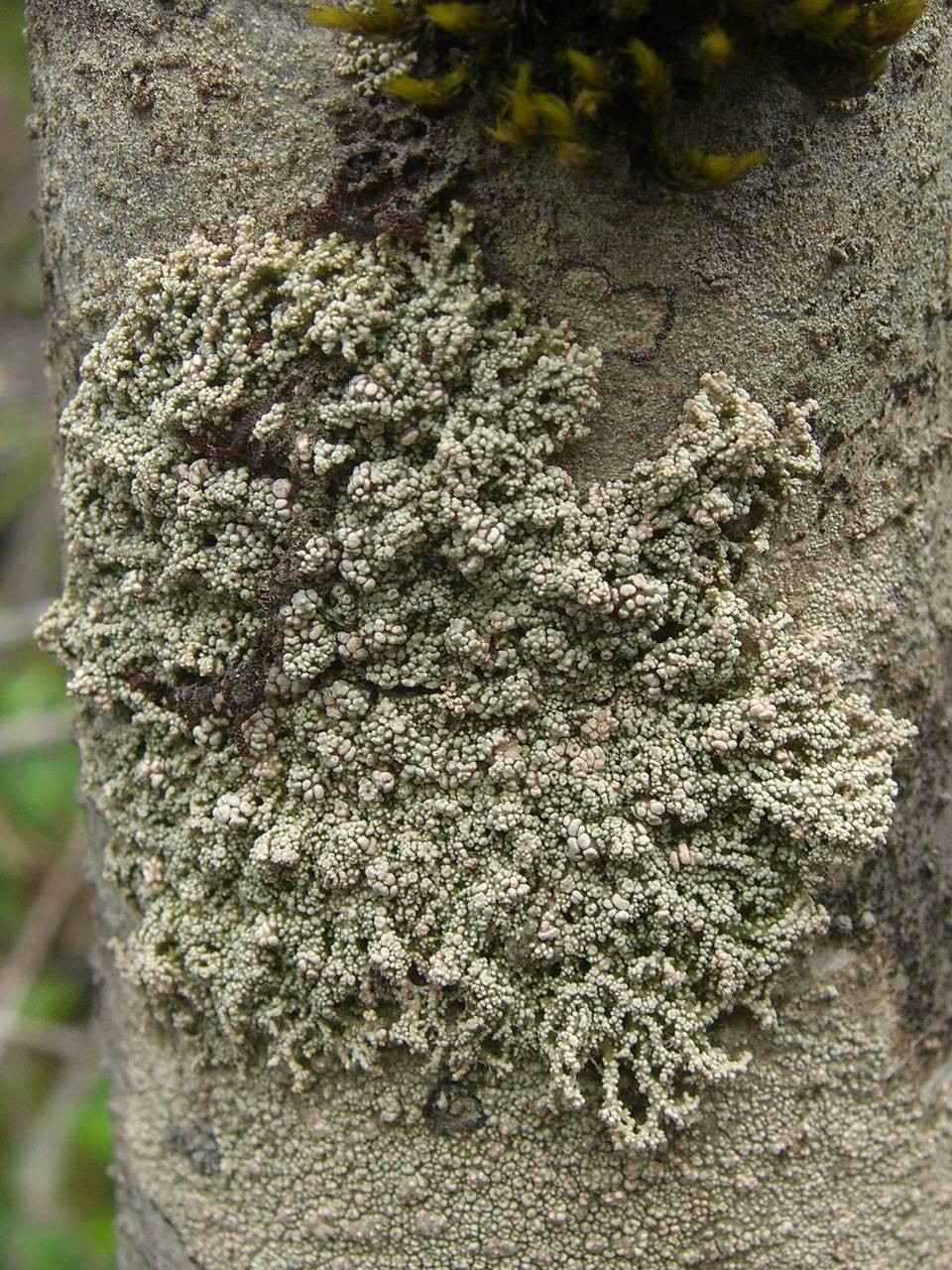
- Coccotrema coccophorum

Scientific classification
- Kingdom: Fungi
- Division: Ascomycota
- Class: Lecanoromycetes
- Order: Pertusariales
- Family: Coccotremataceae; Henssen ex J.C.David & D.Hawksw. (1991)

Type genus
- Coccotrema Müll.Arg. (1888)

Genera
- Coccotrema; Gyalectaria; Parasiphula

= Coccotremataceae =

Family of lichen

The Coccotremataceae are a family of lichen-forming fungi in the order Pertusariales. Species in this widely distributed family grow on bark or rocks, especially in maritime regions.

== Genera ==
As of March 2021, Species Fungorum accepts 3 genera and 23 species, in the family Coccotremataceae. This is a list of the genera in the Coccotremataceae based on a 2020 review and summary of fungal classification by Wijayawardene and colleagues. Following the genus name is the taxonomic authority (those who first circumscribed the genus; standardized author abbreviations are used), year of publication, and the number of species:

- Coccotrema Müll.Arg. (1889) – 16 spp.
- Gyalectaria I.Schmitt, Kalb & Lumbsch (2010) – 3 spp.
- Parasiphula Kantvilas & Grube (2006) – 7 spp.
