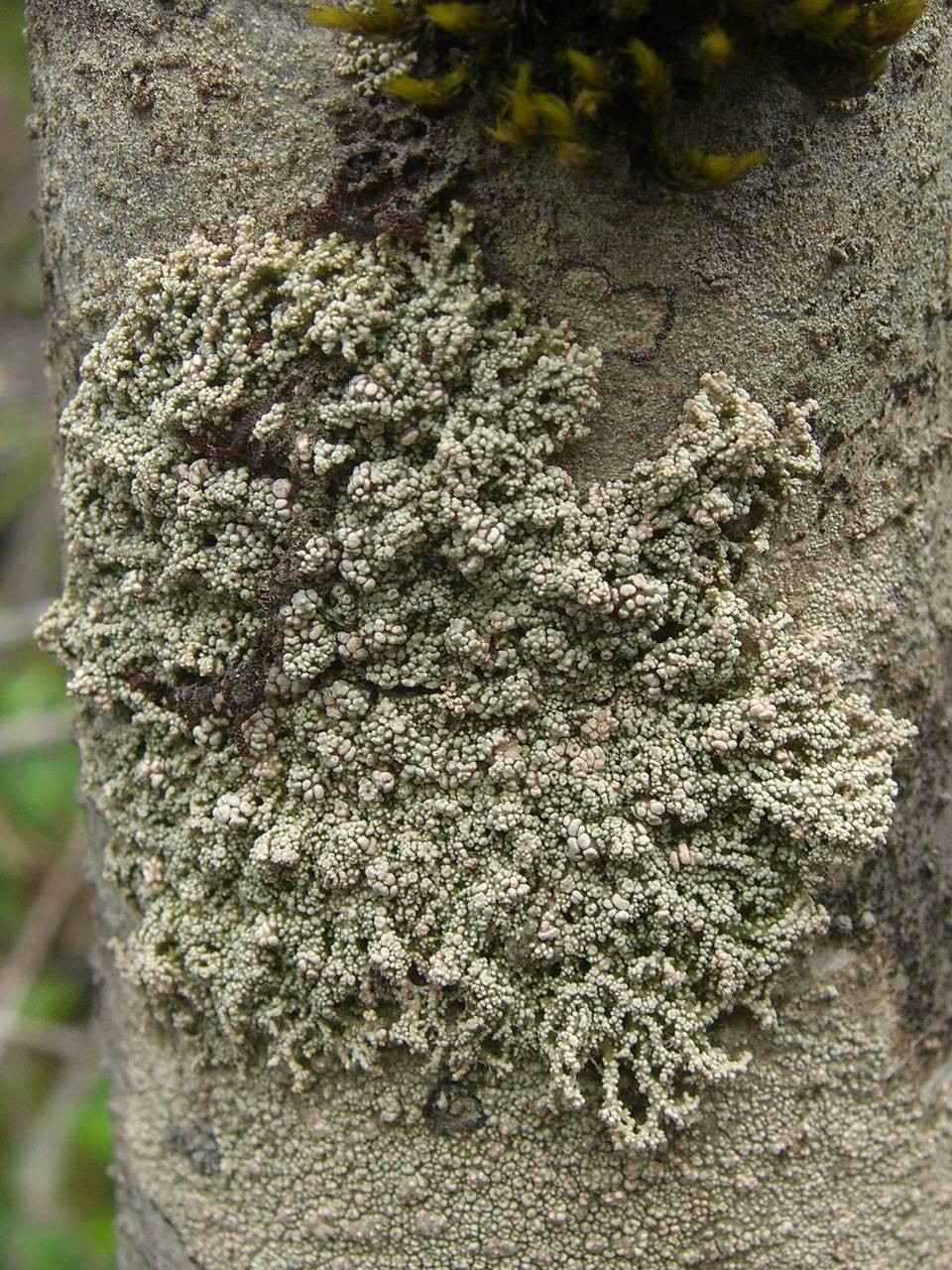
- Coccotrema colobinum

Scientific classification
- Domain: Eukaryota
- Kingdom: Fungi
- Division: Ascomycota
- Class: Lecanoromycetes
- Order: Pertusariales
- Family: Coccotremataceae
- Genus: Coccotrema; Müll.Arg. (1889)

Type species
- Coccotrema antarcticum Müll.Arg. (1889)

Synonyms
- Verrucaria sect. Verrucarina Hue (1914); Verrucarina (Hue) Zahlbr. (1931)

= Coccotrema =

Genus of lichen

Coccotrema is a genus of lichen-forming fungi. It is the type genus of the family Coccotremataceae, in the order Pertusariales. The genus contains 16 species.

== Taxonomy ==
Coccotrema was circumscribed by Swiss botanist Johannes Müller Argoviensis in 1889, with Coccotrema antarcticum assigned as the type species.

In a 2001 publication, Schmidt and colleagues showed, using molecular phylogenetics, that the species then known as Lepolichen coccophorus (the type species of the genus Lepolichen, created by Trevisan in 1853) was nested in a clade that contained Coccotrema species, and so transferred that species into Coccotrema, as Coccotrema coccophorum. However, the genus Lepolichen is older than Coccotrema, and so its name has priority according to the rules for botanical nomenclature. To minimize nomenclatural disruption, Alan Fryday and colleagues submitted a proposal to conserve the name Coccotrema against Lepolichen. The proposal was accepted by the Nomenclature Committee for Fungi in 2023.

== Species ==
- Coccotrema antarcticum Müll.Arg. (1889)
- Coccotrema citrinescens P.James & Coppins (1992) – Europe
- Coccotrema coccophorum (Mont.) I.Schmitt, Messuti & Lumbsch (2001)
- Coccotrema colobinum (Tuck.) Messuti (2003)
- Coccotrema corallinum Messuti (2002) – South America
- Coccotrema cucurbitula (Mont.) Müll.Arg. (1889)
- Coccotrema fernandezianum Messuti (2002) – South America
- Coccotrema hahriae T.Sprib. & Tønsberg (2010) – Alaska
- Coccotrema magellanicum Messuti (2002) – South America
- Coccotrema maritimum Brodo (1973) – North America
- Coccotrema minutum (Degel.) R.Sant. (2010)
- Coccotrema pocillarium (Cumm.) Brodo (1973)
- Coccotrema porinopsis (Nyl.) Imshaug ex Yoshim. (1974)
- Coccotrema rubromarginatum Fryday (2019) – Falkland Islands
- Coccotrema sphaerophorum Vain. (1926)
