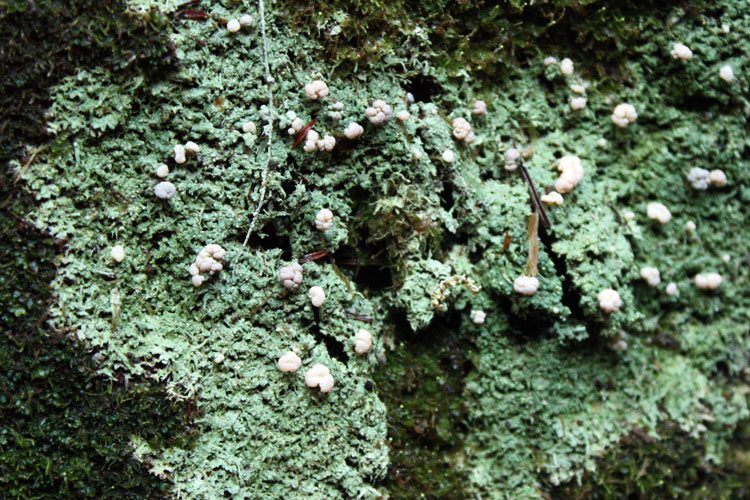
- Icmadophila ericetorum growing on a rotten log on Meares Island, west coast of Canada.

Scientific classification
- Kingdom: Fungi
- Division: Ascomycota
- Class: Lecanoromycetes
- Order: Pertusariales
- Family: Icmadophilaceae
- Genus: Icmadophila; Trevis. (1852)

Type species
- Icmadophila aeruginosa (Scop.) Trevis. (1852)

Species
- I. adversum I. aversa I. coronata I. elveloides I. ericetorum I. splachnirima

Synonyms
- Cystolobis Clem. (1909); Glossodium Nyl. (1855); Icmadophilomyces E.A.Thomas ex Cif. & Tomas. (1953); Knightiella Müll.Arg. (1886); Phycodiscis Clem. (1909); Thelidea Hue (1902); Tupia L.Marchand (1830)

= Icmadophila =

Genus of fungi

Icmadophila is a genus of crustose lichen. The genus has a widespread distribution in the Northern Hemisphere and contains six species. The only species found in North America, Icmadophila ericetorum, has a mint green crustose thallus that is dotted with bright pink apothecial disks, and is sometimes colloquially referred to as "fairy puke". It aggressively grows over mosses on well-rotted wood and peat. It looks very distinctive, but may be confused with species of Dibaeis.
