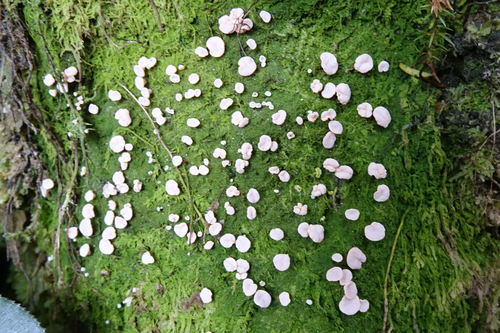
- Dibaeis absoluta in New Zealand

Scientific classification
- Kingdom: Fungi
- Division: Ascomycota
- Class: Lecanoromycetes
- Order: Pertusariales
- Family: Icmadophilaceae
- Genus: Dibaeis; Clem. (1909)

Type species
- Dibaeis rosea (Pers.) Clem. (1909)

= Dibaeis =

Genus of fungi

Dibaeis is a genus of lichen-forming fungi in the family Icmadophilaceae. The genus is widely distributed in tropical regions. Dibaeis was circumscribed in 1909 by Frederic Edward Clements with Dibaeis rosea as the type species. Several species were transferred from other genera in a 1993 publication.

== Species ==
- Dibaeis absoluta (Tuck.) Kalb & Gierl (1993)
- Dibaeis arcuata (Stirt.) Kalb & Gierl (1993)
- Dibaeis birmensis Kalb & Gierl (1993)
- Dibaeis columbiana (Vain.) Kalb & Gierl (1993)
- Dibaeis cretacea Elix & Kantvilas (1993)
- Dibaeis fungoides (Sw.) Kalb & Gierl (1993)
- Dibaeis globulifera Kalb & Gierl (1993)
- Dibaeis holstii (Müll.Arg.) Kalb & Gierl (1993)
- Dibaeis inaequalis Kalb & Gierl (1993)
- Dibaeis inundata Kantvilas (2018)
- Dibaeis pulogensis (Vain.) Kalb & Gierl (1993)
- Dibaeis rosea (Pers.) Clem. (1909)
- Dibaeis sorediata Kalb & Gierl (1993)
- Dibaeis stipitata Kalb & Gierl (1993)
- Dibaeis umbrelliformis Kalb & Gierl (1993)
- Dibaeis weberi (J.W.Thomson) Kalb & Gierl (1993)
- Dibaeis yurii (S.Y.Kondr., Lőkös, S.O.Oh & Hur) S.Y.Kondr., Lőkös & Hur (2015)
