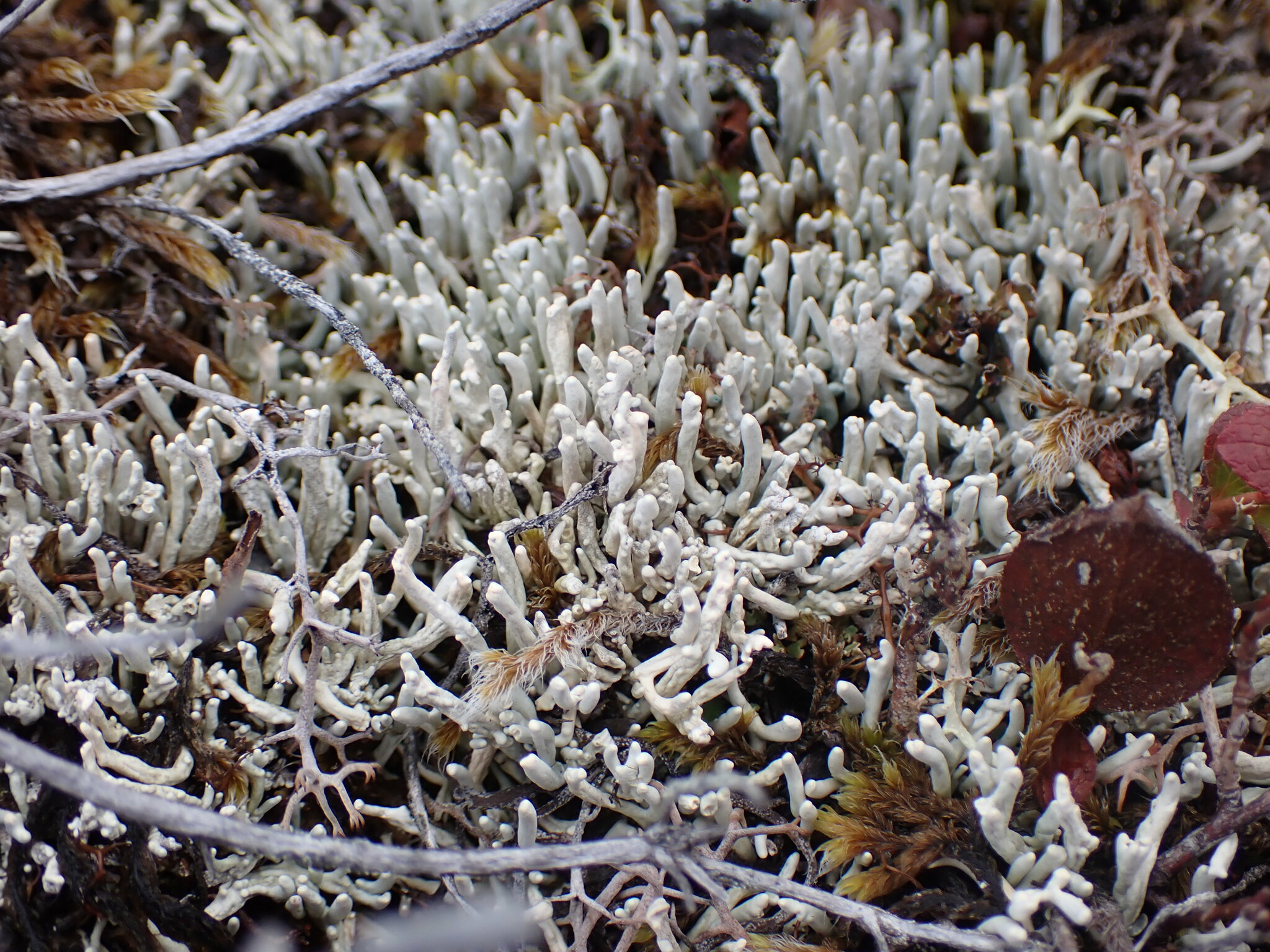
- Siphula ceratites

Scientific classification
- Kingdom: Fungi
- Division: Ascomycota
- Class: Lecanoromycetes
- Order: Pertusariales
- Family: Icmadophilaceae
- Genus: Siphula; Fr. (1831)

Type species
- Siphula ceratites (Wahlenb.) Fr. (1831)

Species
- 22

Synonyms
- Nylanderiella Hue (1914)

= Siphula =

Genus of lichens

Siphula is a genus of lichen-forming fungi in the family Icmadophilaceae. The widespread genus was circumscribed by the Swedish mycologist Elias Fries in 1831.

== Description ==
The genus Siphula includes lichens with a shrubby, upright thallus (the lichen body) that is sparsely branched and has a whitish appearance. The outer surface, or cortex, is pseudoparenchymatous, meaning it consists of densely packed cells resembling plant parenchyma (common plant tissue). Siphula species partner with chlorococcoid algae, a type of green algae that supplies the lichen with energy through photosynthesis.

Inside the thallus, the medulla (inner tissue layer) is compact and has fungal filaments (hyphae) that are generally aligned in a longitudinal direction. No reproductive structures, such as apothecia (spore-producing bodies) or conidiomata (asexual spore-producing bodies), have been observed to occur in this genus.

Chemically, Siphula lichens contain various compounds including p- and m-depsides, dibenzofurans, and chromones, such as the compound siphulin.

== Habitat and distribution ==
Siphula species are found growing on peaty soils and on acid-leached bark in temperate rainforests as well as in wet alpine environments. This genus has a cosmopolitan distribution, occurring across various regions worldwide.

== Species ==
As of October 2024, Species Fungorum accepts 22 species of Siphula:

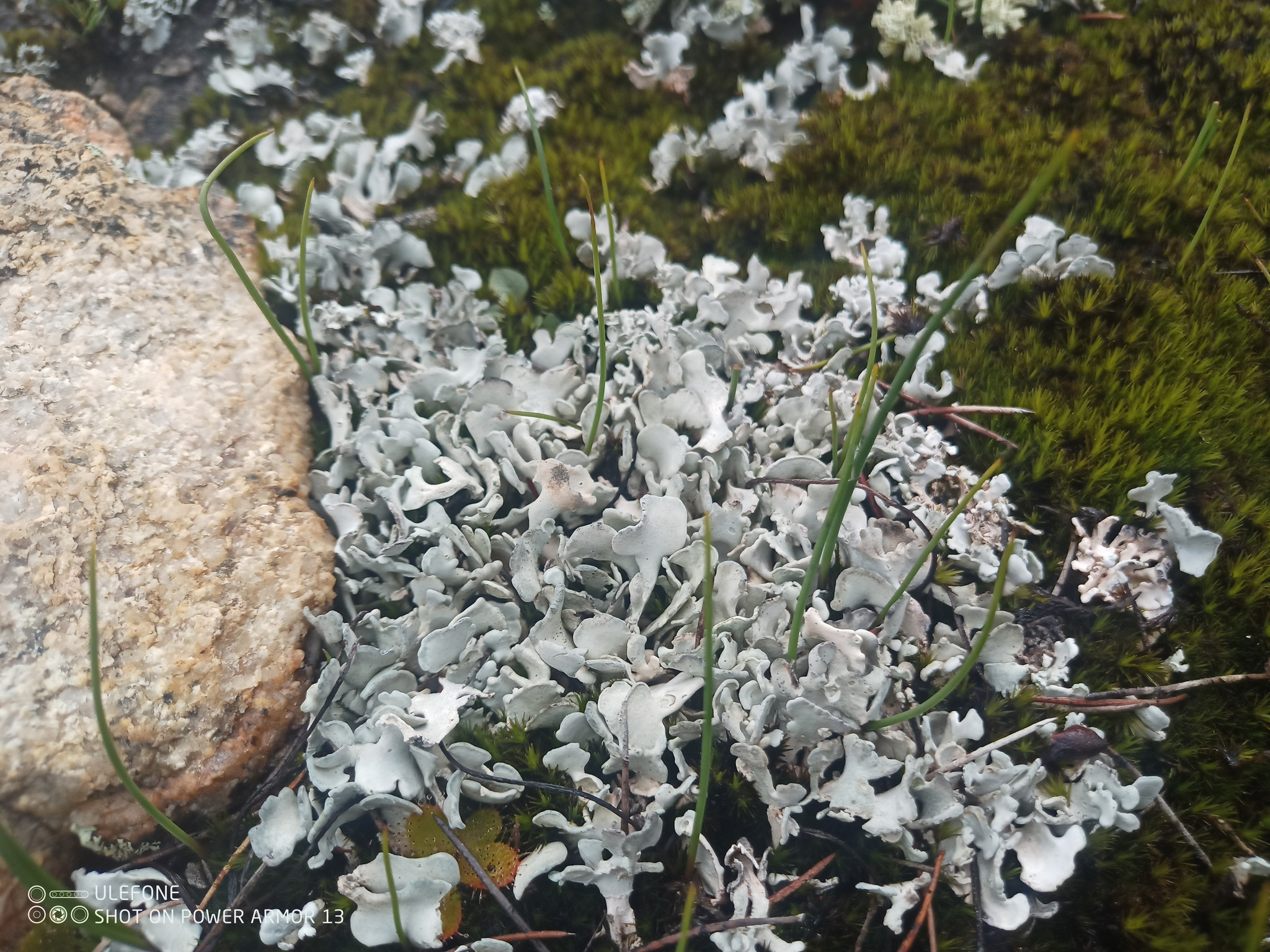
Siphula coriacea

- Siphula australiensis Kantvilas (2004)
- Siphula capensis Kantvilas (2023)
- Siphula ceratites (Wahlenb.) Fr. (1831)
- Siphula chimantensis V.Marcano (2021)
- Siphula coriacea Taylor ex Nyl. (1860)
- Siphula crittendenii Kantvilas (2023)
- Siphula decumbens Nyl. (1888)
- Siphula dissoluta Nyl. (1888)
- Siphula fastigiata (Nyl.) Nyl. (1863)
- Siphula flavovirens Kantvilas, Zedda & Elix (2003)
- Siphula gracilis Kantvilas (1998)
- Siphula paramensis V.Marcano & L. Castillo (2021)
- Siphula parhamii Kantvilas (2004)
- Siphula pteruloides Nyl. (1859)
- Siphula subpteruloides V.Marcano (2021)
- Siphula subsimplex V.Marcano (2021)
- Siphula verrucigera (J.F.Gmel.) R.Sant. (1966)
