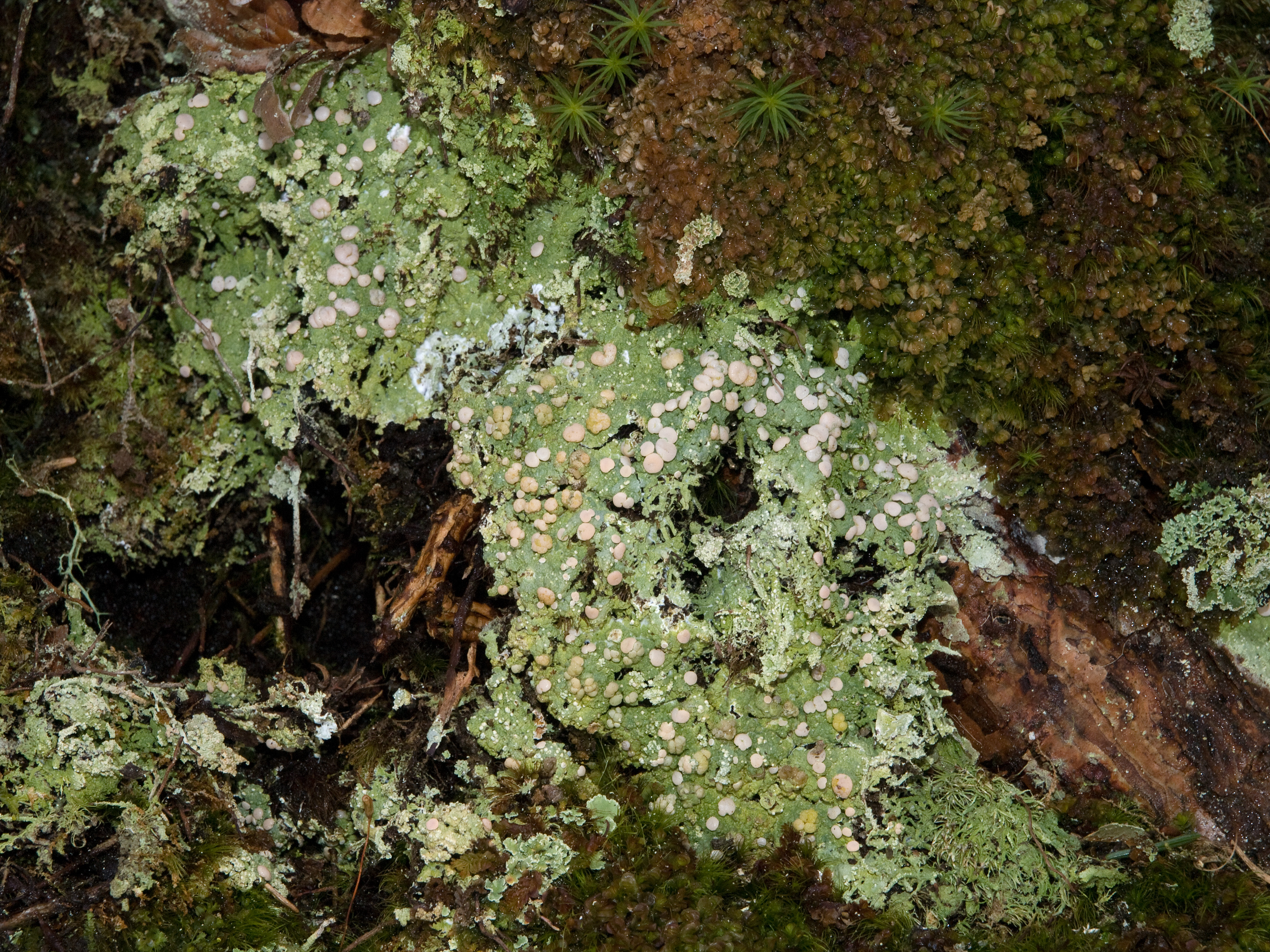
- Icmadophila ericetorum

Scientific classification
- Kingdom: Fungi
- Division: Ascomycota
- Class: Lecanoromycetes
- Order: Pertusariales
- Family: Icmadophilaceae; Triebel (1993)

Type genus
- Icmadophila Trevis. (1853)

Genera
- Dibaeis; Endocena; Icmadophila; Knightiellastrum; Pseudobaeomyces; Siphula; Siphulella; Siphulopsis; Thamnolia

= Icmadophilaceae =

Family of lichen-forming fungi

The Icmadophilaceae are a family of lichen-forming fungi in the order Pertusariales. The family was circumscribed in 1993 by the mycologist Dagmar Treibel. It contains 9 genera and 35 species.

== Description ==
Icmadophilaceae species are usually crust-like to shrub-like in form. Their photobiont partner is chlorococcoid, which is crucial for their survival. Their apothecia (fruiiting bodies) are typically biatorine in form, meaning they have a light-coloured (not carbonised) margin, and are often pink in colour. Some may have stalk-like structures, referred to as pseudopodetia.

Within these reproductive structures, Icmadophilaceae lichens have unbranched filaments called paraphyses, which are amyloid. The asci, or spore sacs, in these lichens are thin-walled and lack a thickened top section (apical tholus) but have a thin, amyloid cap at their tips. They are typically cylindrical in shape.

Each ascus typically contains eight spores. These spores come in various shapes – ellipsoid, oblong, fusiform (spindle-shaped), to cutriform (knife-shaped) – and are clear (hyaline) and non-amyloid. In addition to spore reproduction, Icmadophilaceae lichens can also reproduce asexually through structures called pycnidia, which produce rod-shaped (bacillar), hyaline conidia (asexual spores).

In terms of chemical composition, this family is characterised by a variety of depsides, a type of secondary metabolite (lichen product) commonly found in lichens.

== Genera ==
- Dibaeis Clem. (1909) – ca. 14 spp.
- Endocena Cromb. (1876) – 2 spp.
- Icmadophila Trevis. (1852) – 4 spp.
- Knightiellastrum L.Ludw. & Kantvilas (2020) – 1 sp.
- Pseudobaeomyces M.Satô (1940) – 2 spp.
- Siphula Fr. (1831) – 26 spp.
- Siphulella Kantvilas, Elix & P.James (1992) – 1 sp.
- Siphulopsis Kantvilas & A.R.Nilsen (2020) – 1 sp.
- Thamnolia Ach. ex Schaerer (1850) – 4 spp.
