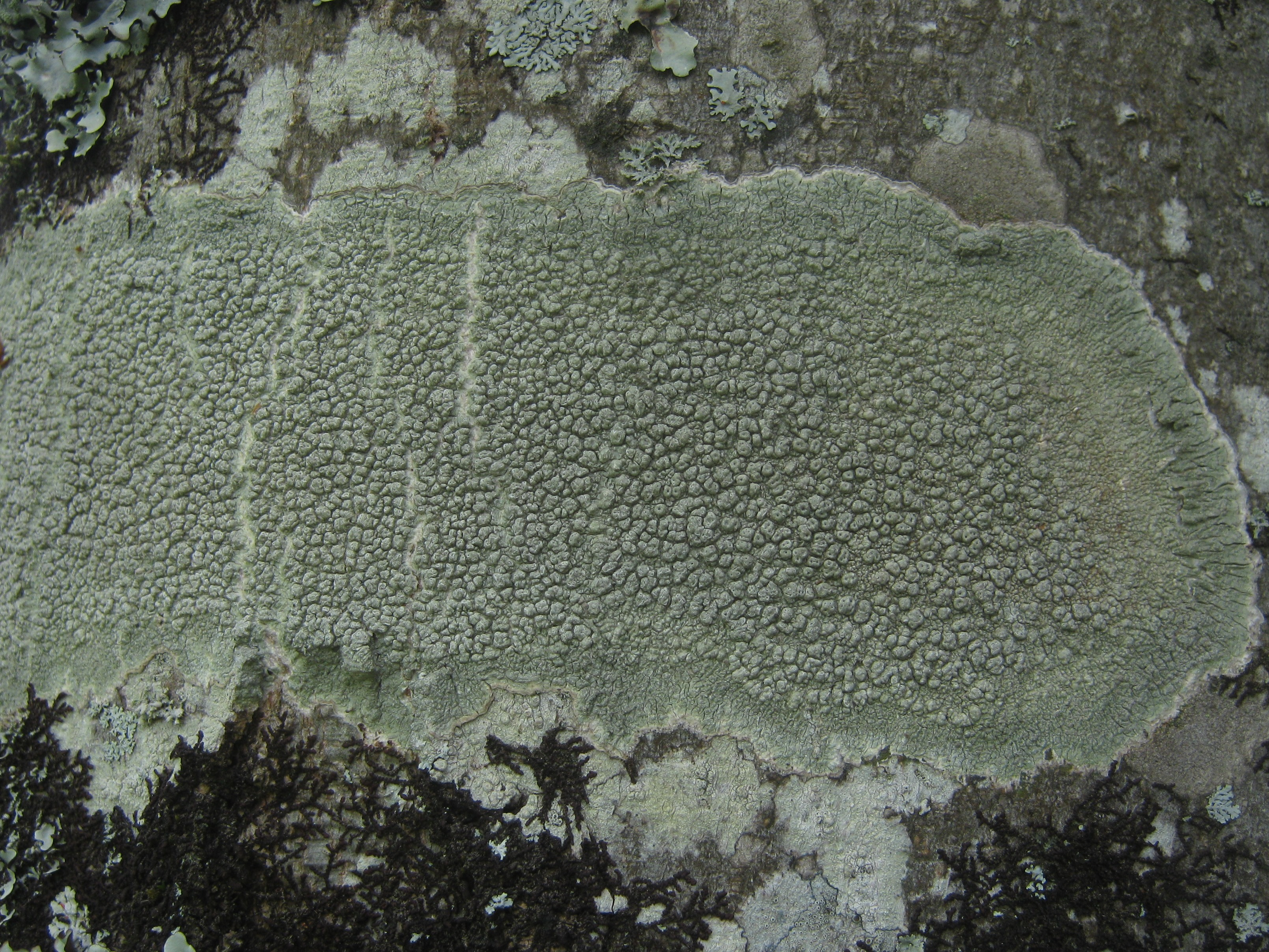
- Pertusaria pertusa

Scientific classification
- Kingdom: Fungi
- Division: Ascomycota
- Class: Lecanoromycetes
- Subclass: Ostropomycetidae
- Order: Pertusariales; M.Choisy ex D.Hawksw. & O.E.Erikss. (1986)

Families
- Agyriaceae; Coccotremataceae; Icmadophilaceae; Megasporaceae; Microcaliciaceae; Ochrolechiaceae; Pertusariaceae; Varicellariaceae

= Pertusariales =

Order of fungi

The Pertusariales are an order of fungi in the class Lecanoromycetes, comprising 8 families, 31 genera, and over 600 species, many of which form lichens. This diverse group is characterized by complex taxonomic history and ongoing phylogenetic revisions. Originally proposed by Maurice Choisy in 1949 and later formally published by the lichenologists David L. Hawksworth and Ove Eriksson in 1986, Pertusariales has undergone significant reclassification due to molecular phylogenetics studies. The order includes well-known genera such as Pertusaria and Ochrolechia, as well as families like Megasporaceae and Icmadophilaceae.

Pertusariales species exhibit a wide range of morphological features and ecological roles, from non-lichenized fungi to various forms of lichen symbioses. The order's taxonomy has been subject to considerable debate and revision, with recent research leading to the establishment of new orders and the reassignment of some taxa. This ongoing refinement reflects efforts to more accurately represent evolutionary relationships within the group. Conservation concerns exist for some Pertusariales species, with Lepra andersoniae listed as endangered on the IUCN Red List due to its limited range and specific habitat requirements in the Appalachian Mountains.

== Systematics ==
The order was formally circumscribed by the lichenologists David L. Hawksworth and Ove Eriksson. It was originally proposed by Maurice Choisy in 1949, as a class, but it lacked a description written in Latin, which was a requirement for valid publication. Hawksworth and Eriksson published it validly as an order in 1986. The genus name Pertusaria is the base for both the family names Pertusariaceae and order Pertusariales. It is derived from the Latin pertusus, meaning 'bored through, pierced, perforated', combined with the suffix aria, which implies possession, and alludes to the characteristic fruiting bodies on the thallus surface, immersed in depressions, and opening through a pore.

The order Pertusariales is classified in the subclass Ostropomycetidae (class Lecanoromycetes, division Ascomycota). It has a complex taxonomic history marked by ongoing revisions and debates. Historically, the order encompassed a diverse group of lichen-forming fungi, including the well-known genus Pertusaria. This grouping was primarily based on morphological characteristics. However, recent molecular phylogenetics analyses have challenged traditional classifications, leading to significant changes. For example, Agyrium rufum, once thought to relate to the Trapeliaceae family within Agyriales, was found to be more closely associated with Pertusaria, justifying the merge of Agyriales into Pertusariales. Yet, this merger sparked controversy over which name should prevail due to taxonomic priorities not extending beyond the family rank in fungal nomenclature.

The revision of Pertusariales was further complicated by the identification and establishment of new orders. Researchers at the New York Botanical Garden proposed the creation of Sarrameanales and Trapeliales to accommodate distinct groups of fungi previously misplaced within Agyriales. These efforts align with modern taxonomic practices aiming to reflect evolutionary relationships more accurately. Consequently, the Trapeliaceae, previously associated with Agyriales, was reassigned to the newly established order Trapeliales based on strong molecular evidence distinguishing it from the Pertusariales. This realignment was part of a broader effort to update the lichen herbarium's taxonomic framework to a phylogenetic system reflecting current understanding.

Furthermore, within the Pertusariales, the inclusion and relationships of various genera and families have been subjects of detailed study. Molecular data have supported the separation of certain genera, leading to clearer distinctions between closely related groups. The order now comprises several families, including Pertusariaceae, which houses the type genus Pertusaria.

=== Classification ===
The classification and detailed breakdown of the order Pertusariales, particularly its division into various genera and families, have been subjects of ongoing debate and reevaluation over many years. Questions have arisen regarding the inclusion of the families Coccotremataceae and Megasporaceae, and the genus Loxosporopsis, as their characteristics partly align with those traditionally associated with Pertusariales but also show notable differences. For instance, Coccotremataceae shares morphological and chemical features with Pertusariaceae yet differs in aspects such as the development of the ascoma, the presence of periphyses, and the type of ascus, alongside the absence or presence of cephalodia. Conversely, molecular evidence has both challenged and supported the inclusion of these taxa within Pertusariales.

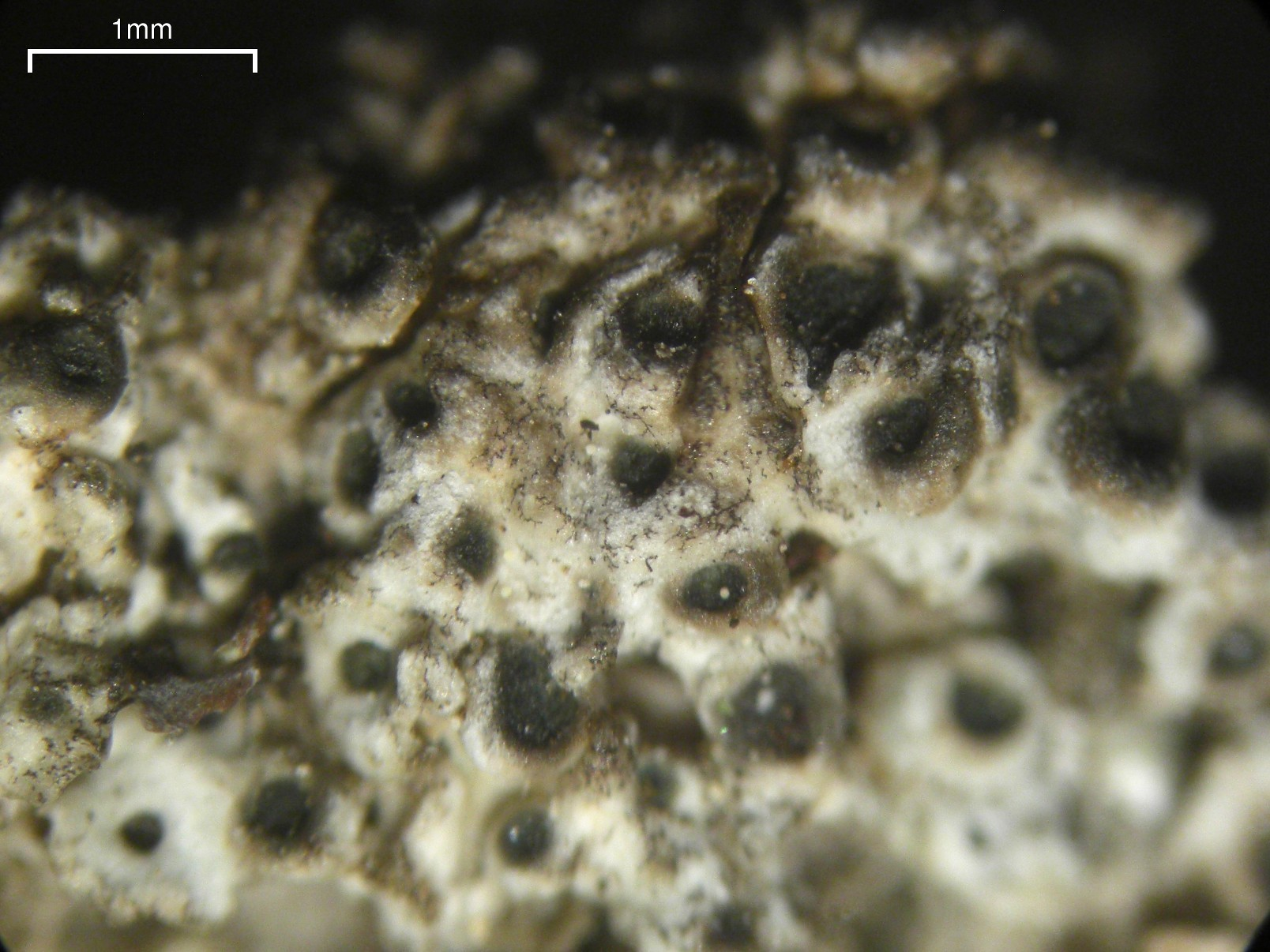
Megaspora verrucosa

The genus Megasporaceae, established for the species Megaspora verrucosa, initially placed within Pertusariales, has exhibited close molecular ties to Aspicilia, challenging its previous classification. Meanwhile, Loxosporopsis, described without definitive familial placement within Pertusariales, has molecular ties suggesting a close relationship with Pertusaria s.str., despite differing in septate ascospore formation, chemical makeup, and ascoma development aspects. These examples illustrate the ongoing redefinitions within Pertusariales based on a combination of morphological and molecular analyses.

Furthermore, the separation between the central Pertusariaceae genera, Ochrolechia and Pertusaria, remains ambiguous, highlighted by the existence of several taxa with intermediate traits and the high variability in their characteristics. This has led to frequent reclassifications among these genera. Molecular studies have exposed Pertusaria as polyphyletic, breaking into distinct monophyletic clusters, thereby challenging the traditional monophyletic view of Pertusariaceae. Although subsequent studies have suggested potential monophyly of Pertusariaceae, these findings have lacked definitive support, complicating the taxonomic understanding of Pertusariales and necessitating further research to clarify these complex phylogenetic relationships.

== Description ==
The order Pertusariales is a group of mostly lichen-forming fungi. The thallus, or lichen body, is typically crustose, meaning it forms a crust-like layer that closely adheres to the substrate. In some species, the thallus may rarely be slightly lobed or have a small, leaf-like appearance (minutely foliose).

The reproductive structures of Pertusariales fungi, the apothecia, are typically deeply cup-shaped. These structures often start out embedded within the thallus but eventually become more exposed as they mature. The apothecia may open widely or have a pore-like opening, giving them an appearance similar to perithecia, a different type of fungal reproductive structure. A well-developed thalline margin, which is a rim of tissue derived from the thallus itself, usually surrounds the apothecia.

Inside the apothecia, the tissue between the spore-producing cells (asci) is made up of structures called paraphyses. In some species, these paraphyses are found at the base, while in others, particularly those with pore-like apothecia, they may also be present at the top. The asci themselves are relatively short and broadly cylindrical, with a thick, multi-layered wall that stains with iodine (J+). The top of the asci is often more strongly thickened, and they release their spores through a vertical slit at the apex. Unlike many other fungi, the asci of Pertusariales often contain fewer than eight spores.

The ascospores produced by these fungi are very large, colourless (hyaline), and lack internal divisions (aseptate}). They have a thick, multi-layered wall, which helps protect them in harsh environments. In addition to sexual reproduction via ascospores, Pertusariales fungi can also reproduce asexually through structures called pycnidia, which produce tiny, spore-like cells known as conidia.

== Families and genera ==
The order Pertusariales comprises a diverse array of fungi, organized into several distinct families. These families encompass a wide range of morphological and ecological characteristics, from non-lichenized fungi to various forms of lichen symbioses. In 2006, the order was estimated to contain 450–770 species and "two or three families". Two years later, the Dictionary of the Fungi (10th edition) included 901 species amongst 15 genera and 5 families in the Pertusariales. As of July 2024, according to Species Fungorum in the Catalogue of Life, the order includes 9 families, 34 genera, and 881 species. This significant increase in recognized taxa reflects ongoing revisions based on new molecular and morphological data.

- Agyriaceae Corda (1838)

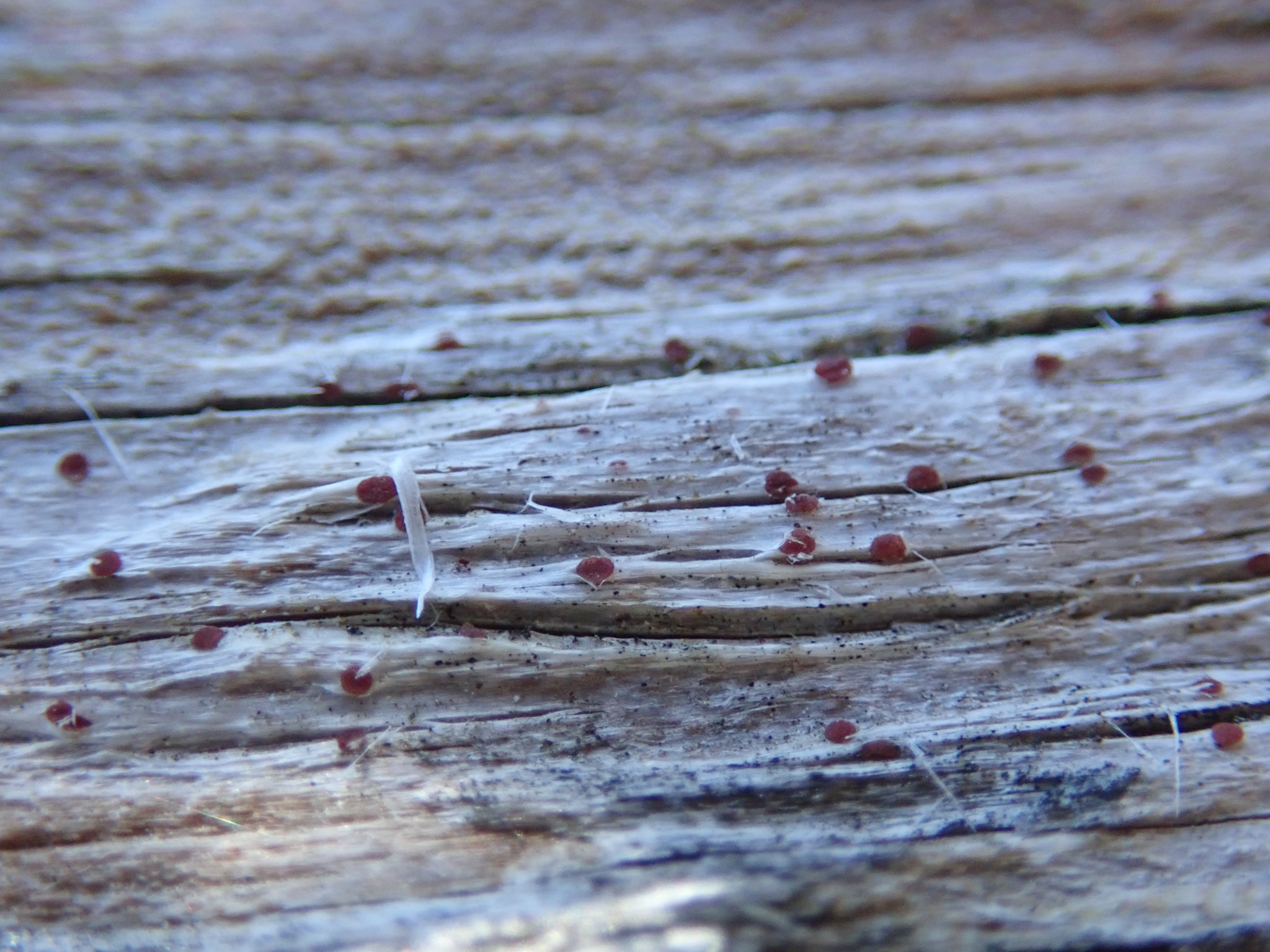
Agyrium rufum

This family consists of non-lichenized fungi. They produce small, round, sessile fruiting bodies called apothecia. Their asci (spore-containing structures) are club-shaped and contain eight colourless, ellipsoid to nearly spherical spores. These fungi are typically found on wood and are distributed worldwide, particularly in temperate regions.

Agyrium – 3 spp.
Miltidea – 1 sp.

- Coccotremataceae Henssen ex J.C.David & D.Hawksw. (1991)

Members of this family are lichenized fungi, forming symbiotic relationships with both green algae and cyanobacteria. Their thalli (fungal bodies) can be crustose, foliose, or fruticose. They produce perithecioid ascomata within wart-like structures. The family is characterized by thick-walled, colourless spores and the presence of certain chemical compounds like depsidones and depsides. They grow on bark, rocks, and soil, with a distribution centered in temperate areas of the Southern Hemisphere.

Coccotrema – 16 spp.
Gyalectaria – 3 spp.
Parasiphula – 7 spp.

- Icmadophilaceae Triebel (1993)
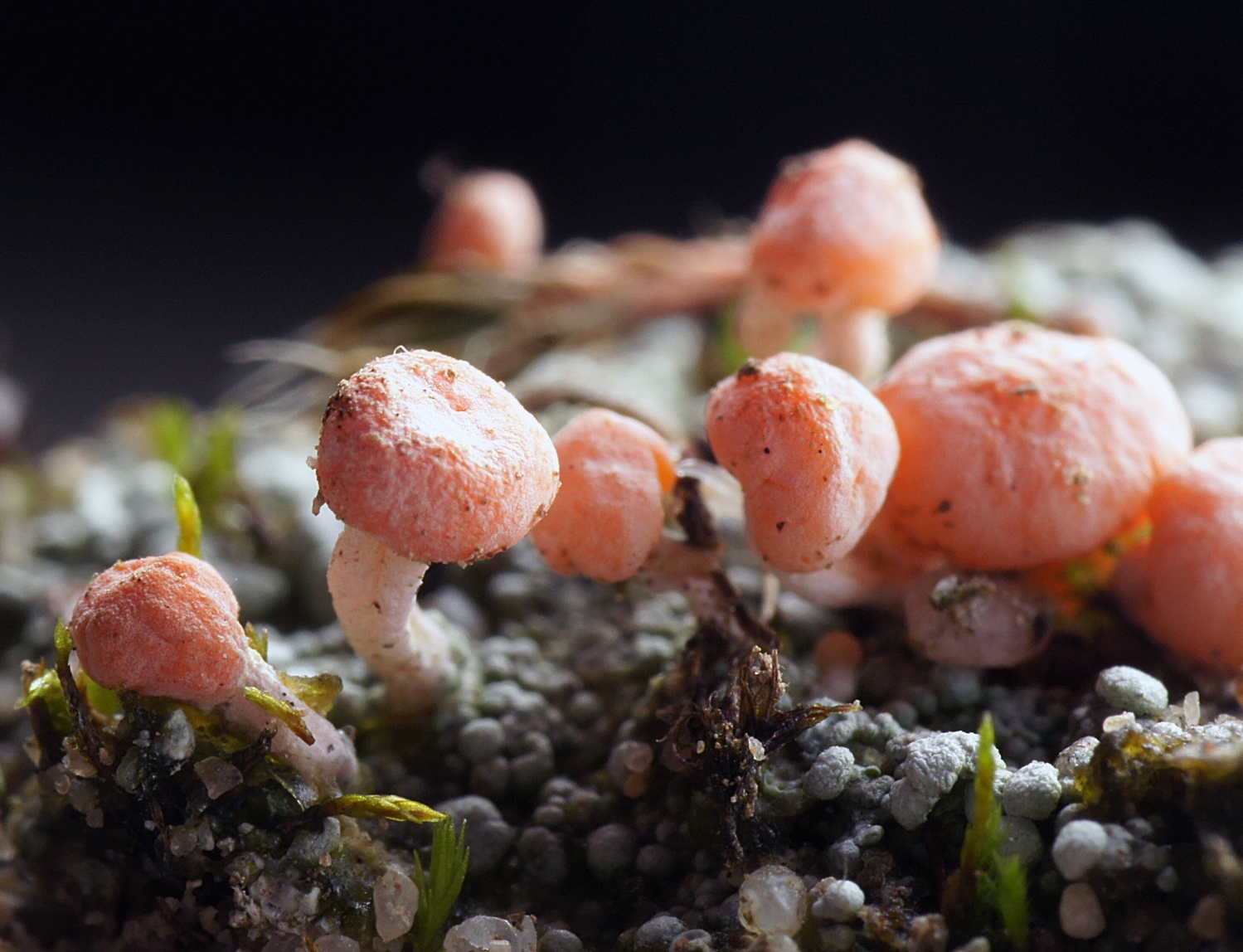
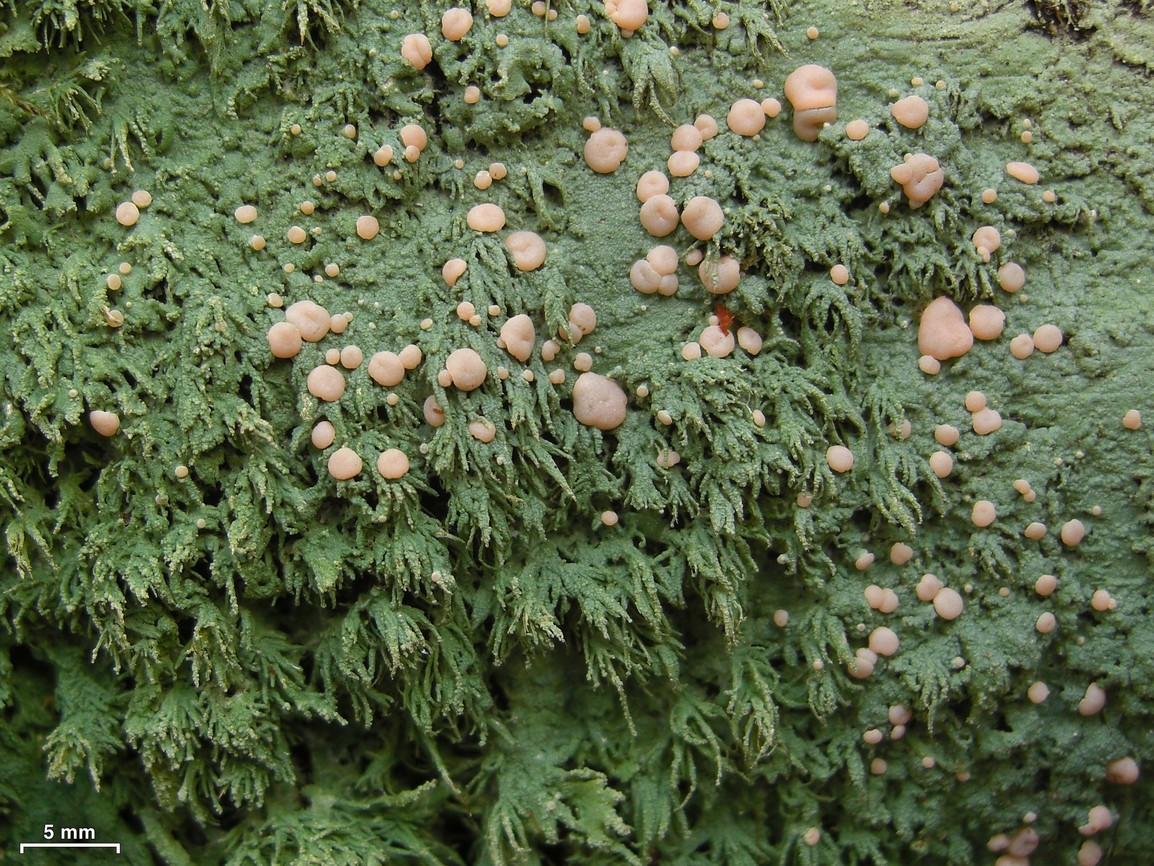
Members of Icmadophilaceae: Dibaeis baeomyces (left) and Icmadophila ericetorum

This family comprises lichenized fungi that form symbiotic relationships with green algae. Their thalli range from crustose to fruticose. They produce distinctive fruiting bodies that are often stalked. Their asci are thin-walled and contain eight colourless spores that can be non-septate or have one septum. These lichens typically contain gyrophoric acid and are found on bark, rocks, and soil, particularly in temperate mountainous regions worldwide.

Dibaeis – ca. 14 spp.
Endocena – 2 spp.
Icmadophila – 4 spp.
Knightiellastrum – 1 spp.
Pseudobaeomyces – 1 sp.
Siphula – 26 spp.
Siphulella – 1 sp.
Siphulopsis – 1 sp.
Thamnolia – 6 spp.

- Megasporaceae Lumbsch (1994)
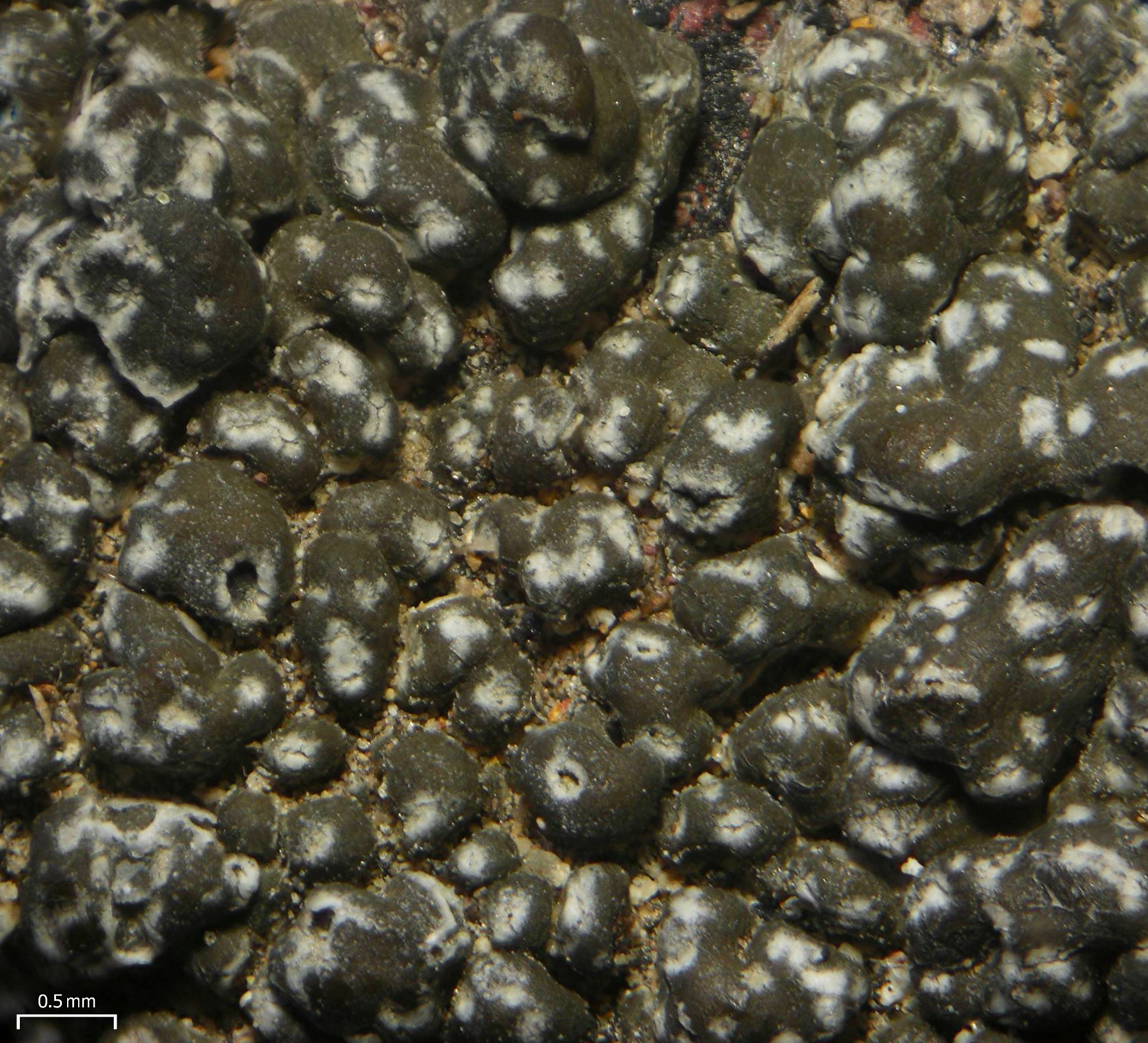
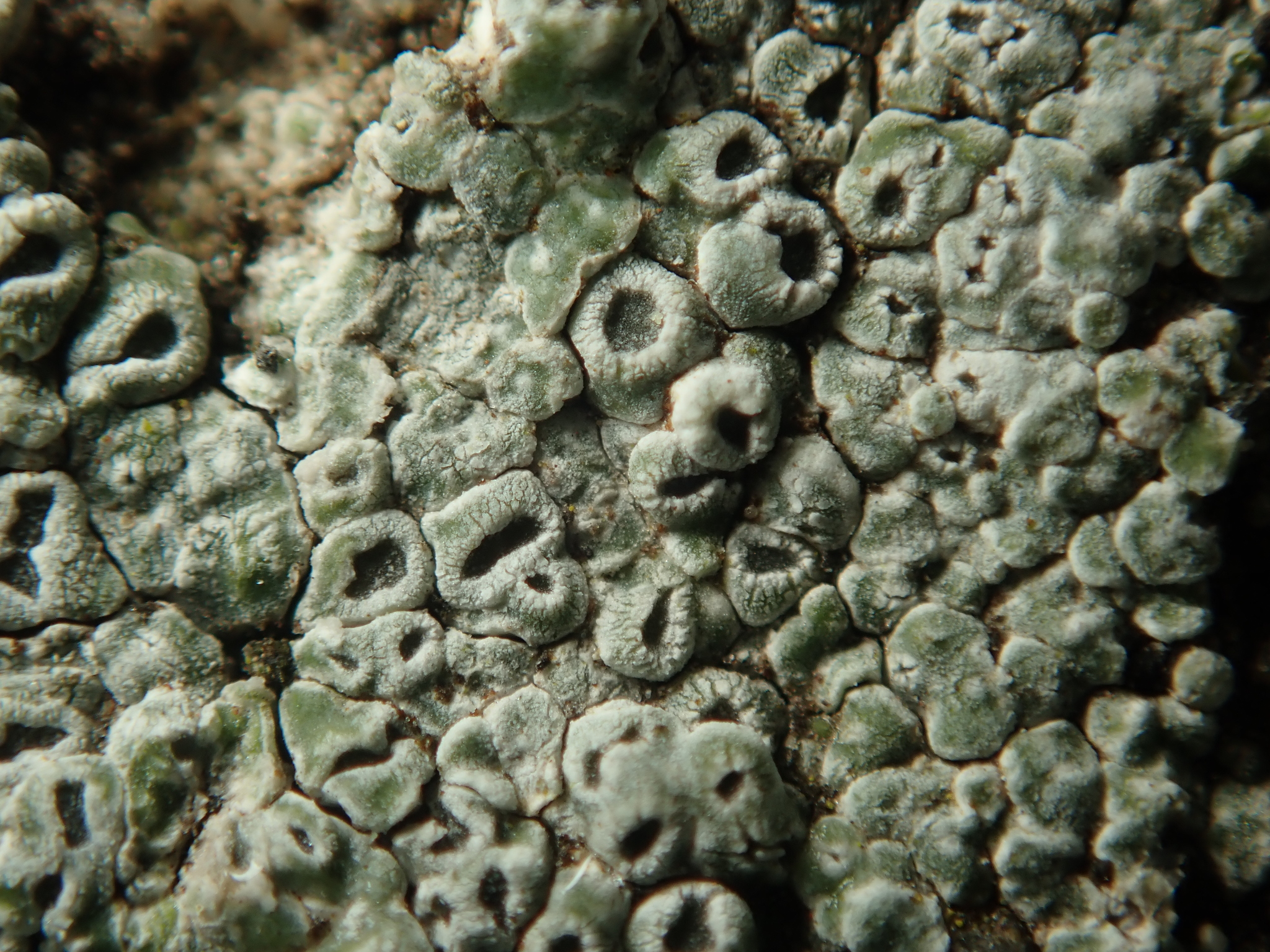
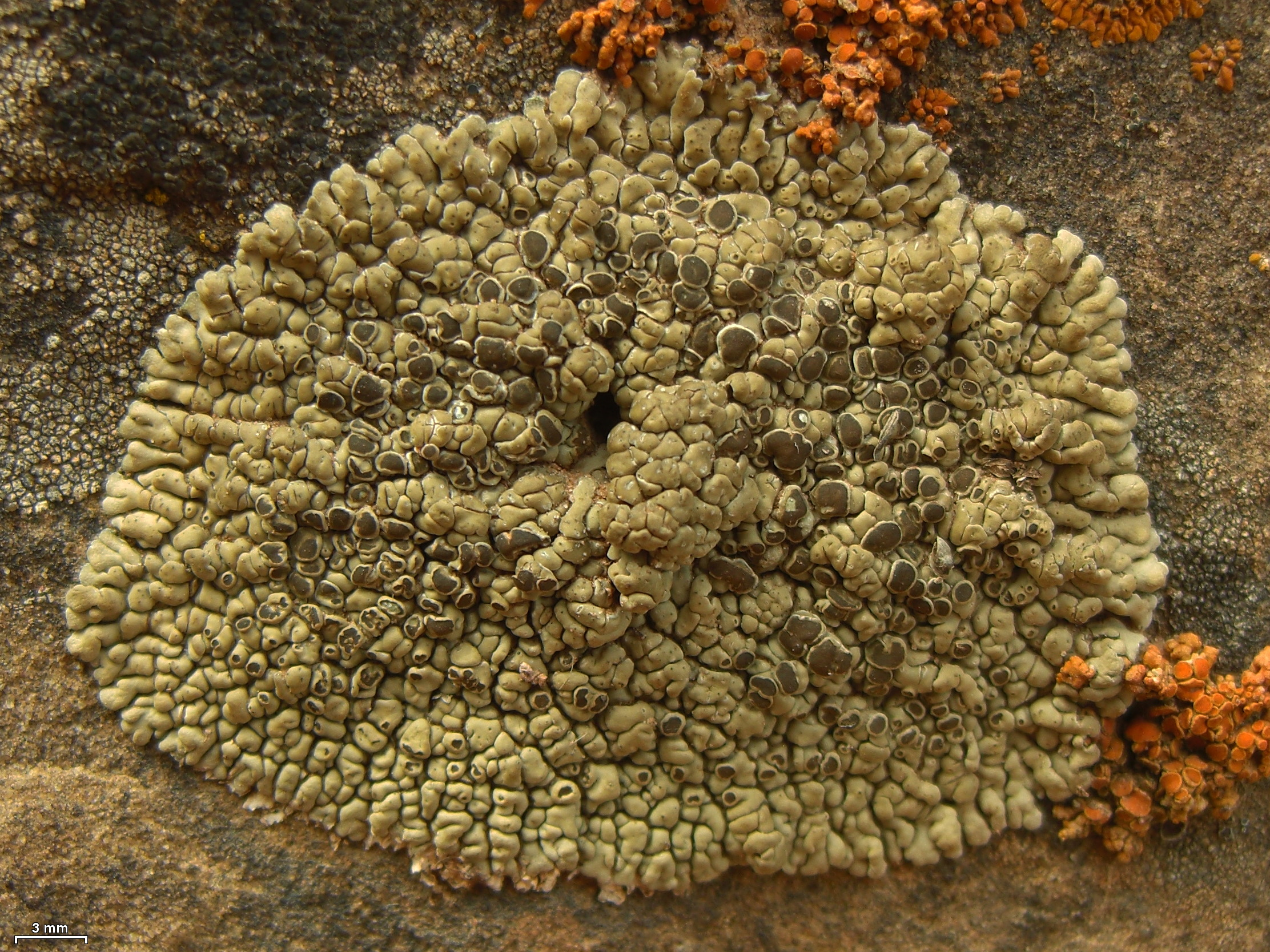
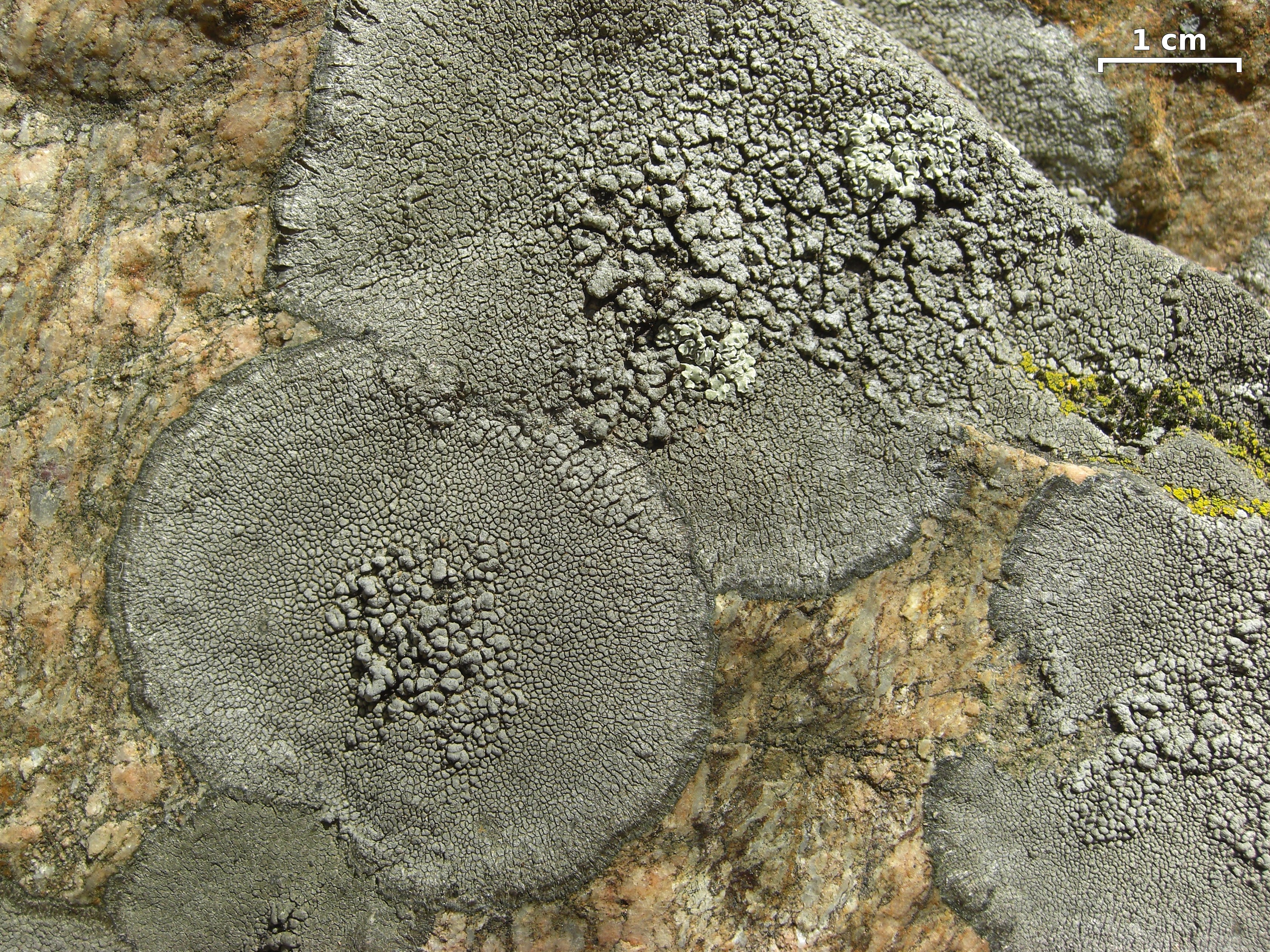
Members of Megasporaceae: clockwise from upper left: Aspicilia americana, Circinaria contorta; Lobothallia praeradiosa; and Aspicilia cyanescens

Members of the Megasporaceae are lichenized fungi with thalli ranging from crustose to foliose. They form symbiotic relationships with green algae. Their fruiting bodies are typically immersed in the thallus. The family is characterized by thin-walled asci containing non-septate, ellipsoid spores. They produce various secondary metabolites including aliphatic acids and depsidones. These lichens are often found growing on soil, plant litter, or bryophytes in temperate regions.

Aspicilia – about 200 spp.
Aspiciliella – 4 spp.
Atrostelia – 1 sp.
Circinaria – ca. 40 spp.
Lobothallia – 12 spp.
Megaspora – 4 spp.
Oxneriaria – 16 spp.
Sagedia – ca. 30 spp.
Teuvoa – 5 spp.

- Microcaliciaceae Tibell (1984)

This small family consists of non-lichenized or lichenicolous fungi (fungi that grow on lichens). They produce distinctive fruiting bodies called mazaedia (a powdery mass of ascospores and paraphyses), which can be sessile or stalked. Their spores are needle-shaped and colourless. The family is characterized by ellipsoid asci and small, round to ellipsoid conidia. These fungi are typically found growing on bark, wood, or other lichens.

Microcalicium – 4 spp.

- Ochrolechiaceae R.C.Harris ex Lumbsch & I.Schmitt (2006)

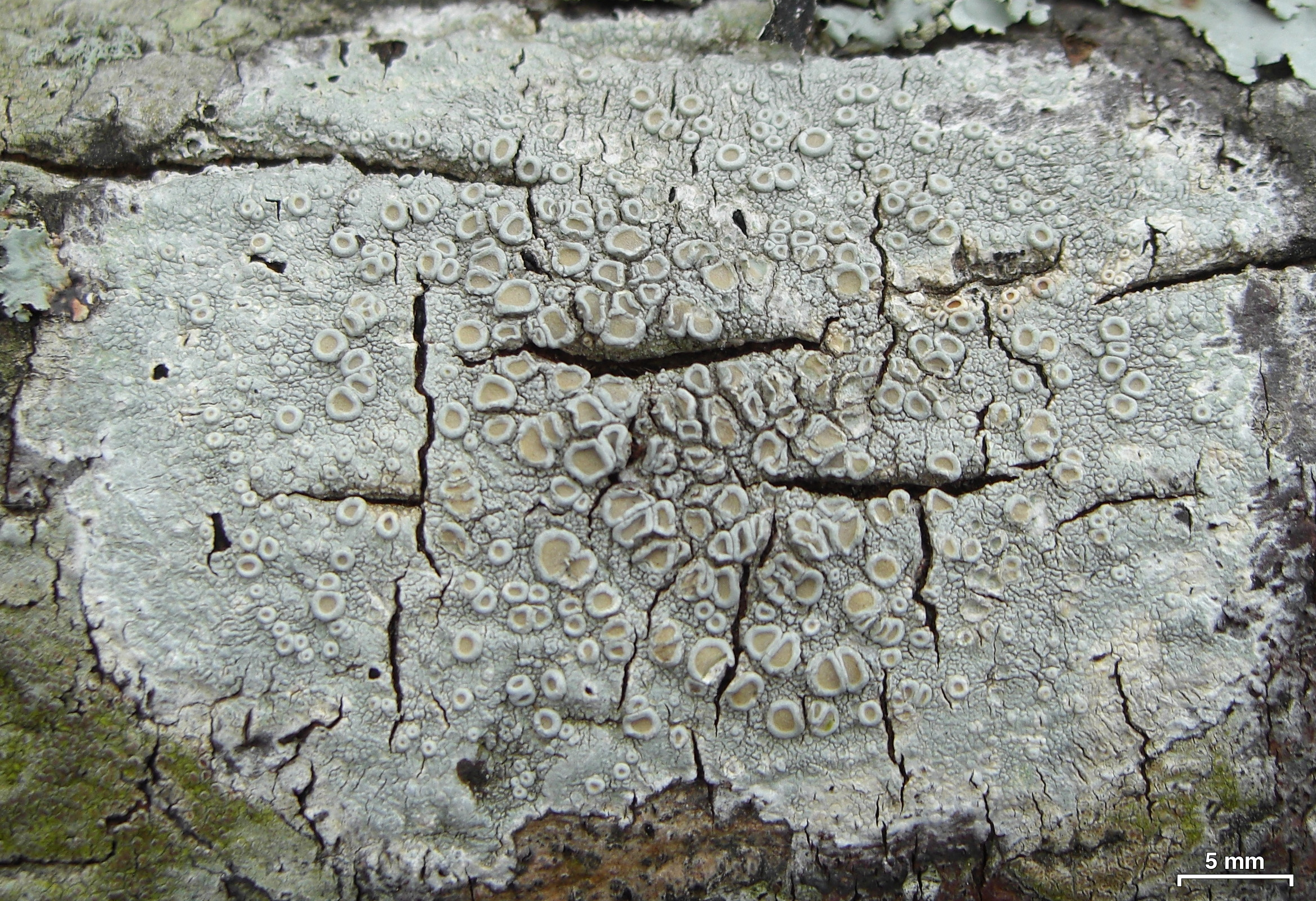
Ochrolechia africana

The family Ochrolechiaceae consists of a single genus of crustose lichens that partner with green algae. They produce disc-shaped fruiting bodies (apothecia) with a distinctive structure. Their asci contain large, colourless, non-septate spores. These lichens are known for producing various chemical compounds including depsides, depsidones, and lichexanthone. They can be found growing on bark, rocks, and soil.

Ochrolechia – 60 spp.

- Pertusariaceae Körb. ex Körb. (1855)

This family of lichenized fungi forms crustose thalli in symbiosis with green algae. Their fruiting bodies can be either perithecioid or apothecioid. They are characterized by large, often thick-walled spores, typically produced in small numbers per ascus. The family is known for its diverse secondary metabolites, including chloroatranorin and various acids. These lichens grow on bark, rocks, and soil. Genus Lepra was resurrected in 2017 to accommodate the former Variolaria-group of Pertusaria.

Lepra – 94 spp.
Loxosporopsis – 1 sp.
Pertusaria – about 400 spp.
Thamnochrolechia – 1 sp.

- Varicellariaceae B.P.Hodk., R.C.Harris & Lendemer ex Lumbsch & Leavitt (2018)

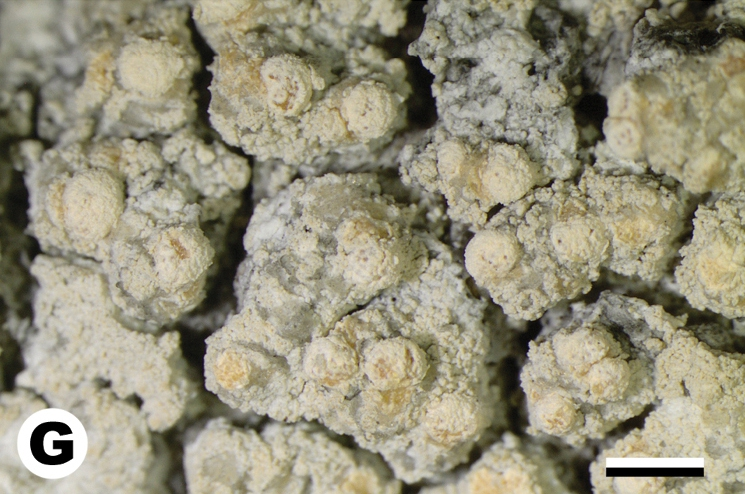
Varicellaria rhodocarpa

This family contains a single genus, Varicellaria, many members of which were transferred from Pertusaria in 2012. Members of this family are crustose lichens that form symbiotic relationships with green algae of the genus Trebouxia. They produce disc-like fruiting bodies (apothecia) and are characterized by a non-amyloid hymenial gel, strongly amyloid asci containing one or two spores, and large, thick-walled, hyaline ascospores with one or two cells. The family was formally established in 2018 after some nomenclatural challenges. Varicellariaceae species have a cosmopolitan distribution and can be found growing on various substrates worldwide.

Varicellaria – 8 spp.

== Habitat and distribution ==
The Pertusariales are found worldwide, with their greatest diversity in temperate and tropical regions. Most species in this order typically grow on bark (corticolous) or wood (lignicolous), but their ecological range is broad. Various species also inhabit rock surfaces (saxicolous), soil (terricolous), and even bryophytes. Additionally, within the family Microcaliciaceae, some non-lichenized fungi are saprotrophic, feeding on decaying bark or wood, while others live parasitically on other lichens (lichenicolous).

== Conservation ==
Three Pertusariales species have been assessed for the IUCN global Red List of Threatened Species. One species of particular conservation concern is Lepra andersoniae, which is narrowly endemic to the Appalachian Mountains in the United States and is listed as endangered on the IUCN Red List. It has a limited range, with an extent of occurrence of only 4,027 km² and an area of occupancy of 16 km². The species is known from just three subpopulations across fewer than 10 sites, with an estimated total of 340–570 mature individuals. L. andersoniae faces threats from recreational activities, climate change, and potential habitat loss. It is restricted to sheltered and vertical faces of high-elevation rock outcrops and talus slopes in spruce-fir forests, making it particularly vulnerable to environmental changes. Conservation efforts for this species include monitoring of extant subpopulations, detailed habitat surveys, and the need for a species-specific management plan.

Two other Pertusariales species have been assessed for the IUCN Red List. Pertusaria rhodostoma, known only from a single historical collection in Colombia, is listed as Data Deficient due to a lack of current information on its population, habitat, and potential threats. In contrast, Lepra acroscyphoides, found in the páramo of Colombia, is listed as a least-concern species. While it faces potential threats from agriculture and grazing, its high-elevation habitat in páramo ecosystems provides some natural protection.
