= Manganese(II) sulfide =

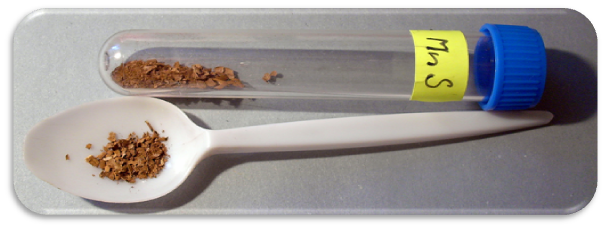
- Manganese(II) sulfide

Names
- IUPAC name Manganese(II) sulfide
- Other names Manganese sulfide Manganese monosulfide Alabandite (cubic); Rambergite (hexagonal)

Identifiers
CAS Number	18820-29-6
3D model (JSmol)	Interactive image
ChemSpider	7969461
ECHA InfoCard	100.038.711
EC Number	242-599-3
PubChem CID	87809
UNII	87Y1S2L575
CompTox Dashboard (EPA)	DTXSID00893974
- InChI: InChI=1S/Mn.S Key: CADICXFYUNYKGD-UHFFFAOYSA-N
- SMILES: [Mn+2].[S-2]

Properties
Chemical formula	MnS
Molar mass	87.003 g/mol
Appearance	Red, green or brown powder
Density	3.99 g/cm^{3}
Melting point	1610 ˚C
Solubility in water	0.0047 g/100 mL (18 °C)

Structure
Crystal structure	Halite (cubic), cF8
Space group	Fm3̅m, No. 225
Coordination geometry	Octahedral (Mn^{2+}); octahedral (S^{2−})

Hazards
- Occupational safety and health (OHS/OSH)
Main hazards	Irritant

Related compounds
Other anions	Manganese(II) oxide Manganese(II) selenide Manganese(II) telluride
Related manganese sulfides	Manganese disulfide
Related compounds	Chromium(II) sulfide Iron(II) sulfide
- Except where otherwise noted, data are given for materials in their standard state (at 25 °C [77 °F], 100 kPa). verify (what is ?) Infobox references

Manganese(II) sulfide is a chemical compound of manganese and sulfur. It occurs in nature as the mineral alabandite (isometric), rambergite (hexagonal), and recently found browneite (isometric, with sphalerite-type structure, extremely rare, known only from a single meteorite.).

== Synthesis ==
Manganese(II) sulfide can be prepared by reacting a manganese(II) salt (such as manganese(II) chloride) with ammonium sulfide:

(NH_{4})_{2}S + MnCl_{2} → 2 NH_{4}Cl + MnS

== Properties ==
The crystal structure of manganese(II) sulfide is similar to that of sodium chloride.

The pink color of MnS likely results from poor coupling between the lowest energy unoccupied Mn orbitals, resulting in discrete states rather than a delocalized band. Thus the lowest energy band-to-band electronic transition requires very high energy (ultraviolet) photons.

== See also ==
- Alabandite, cubic MnS.
- Manganese disulfide, MnS_{2}, also known as Manganese(IV) Sulfide
- Manganese(II) sulfate, MnSO_{4}
- Rambergite, hexagonal MnS.
