= Manganese selenide =

Manganese selenide may refer to:

- Manganese(II) selenide
- Manganese diselenide
