= Rhenium ditelluride =

Names
- IUPAC name Bis(tellanylidene)rhenium
- Other names Rhenium(IV) telluride

Identifiers
CAS Number	12067-00-4
3D model (JSmol)	Interactive image
ChemSpider	74808
ECHA InfoCard	100.031.873
EC Number	235-074-5
PubChem CID	82908
CompTox Dashboard (EPA)	DTXSID4065238
- InChI: InChI=1S/Re.2S Key: ZNDWMUJQNKFBMN-UHFFFAOYSA-N
- SMILES: [Te]=[Re]=[Te]

Properties
Chemical formula	ReTe_{2}
Molar mass	441.41 g/mol
Odor	odorless
Density	8.5 g/cm^{3}
Solubility in water	insoluble

Structure
Crystal structure	Orthorhombic
Lattice constant	a = 1.2972 nm, b = 1.3060 nm, c = 1.4254 nm α = 90°, β = 90°, γ = 90°

Related compounds
Other anions	Rhenium(IV) oxide Rhenium disulfide Rhenium diselenide
Other cations	Manganese diselenide
- Except where otherwise noted, data are given for materials in their standard state (at 25 °C [77 °F], 100 kPa). Infobox references

Rhenium ditelluride is an inorganic compound of rhenium and tellurium with the formula ReTe_{2}. Contrary to rhenium disulfide and diselenide, it does not have a layered structure.
