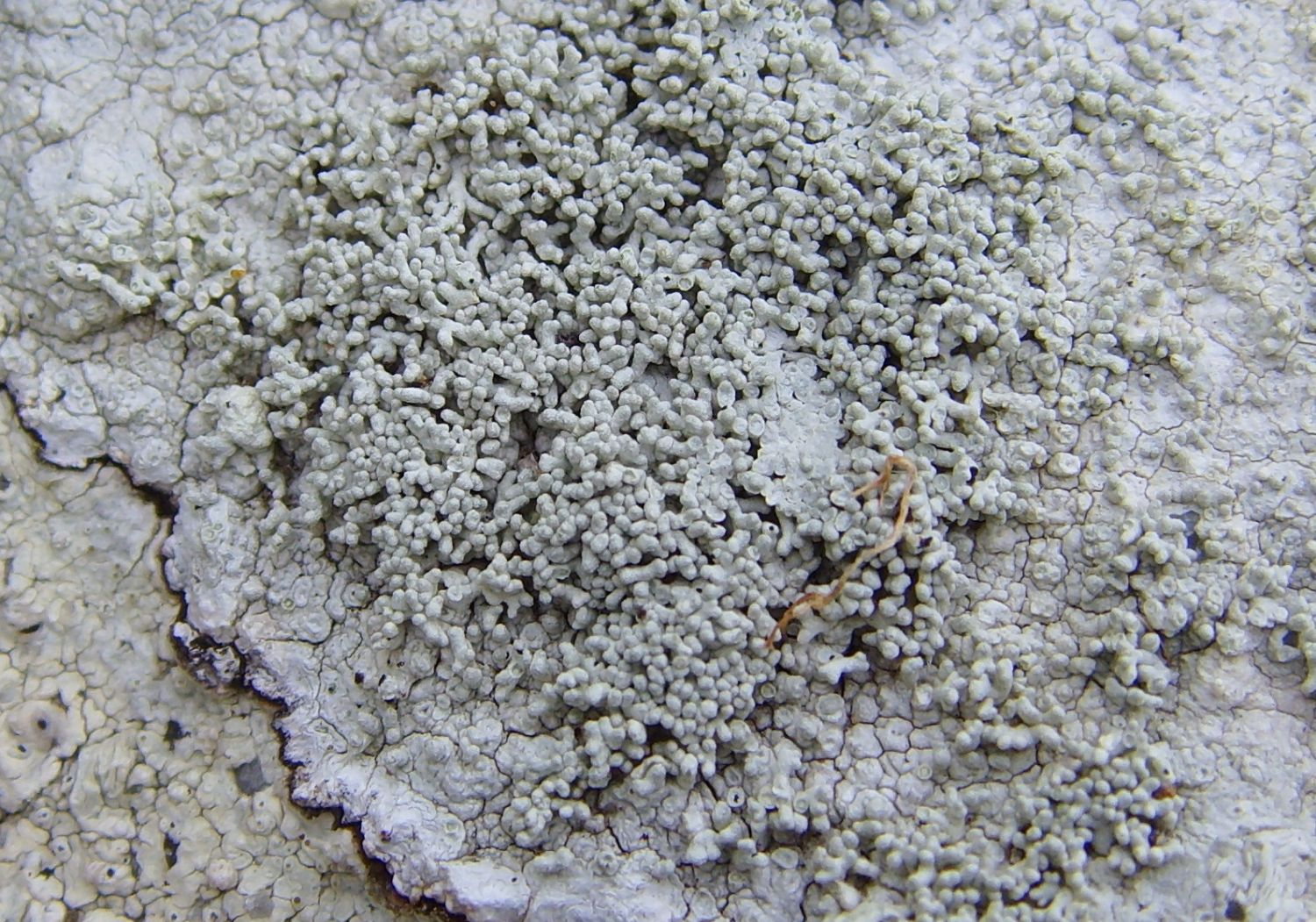

Scientific classification
- Kingdom: Fungi
- Division: Ascomycota
- Class: Lecanoromycetes
- Order: Pertusariales
- Family: Pertusariaceae
- Genus: Lepra
- Species: L. corallina

Binomial name
- Lepra corallina (L.) Hafellner (2016)

Synonyms
- List: Lichen corallinus L. (1767); Stereocaulon corallinum (L.) Schrad. (1794); Isidium corallinum (L.) Ach. (1803); Variolaria corallina (L.) Ach. (1809); Parmelia sordida var. corallina (L.) Fr. (1827); Parmelia sordida f. corallina (L.) Wallr. (1831); Parmelia glaucoma var. corallinus (L.) Spreng. (1832); Parmelia rimosa f. corallina (L.) Schaer. (1839); Urceolaria corallina (L.) Oken (1841); Lecanora rimosa f. corallina (L.) Rabenh. (1845); Zeora rimosa f. corallina (L.) Kremp. (1861); Lecanora sordida var. corallina (L.) Th.Fr. (1861); Pertusaria corallina (L.) Arnold (1861); Pertusaria ocellata var. corallina (L.) Körb. (1863); Lecanora glaucoma var. corallina (L.) Grognot (1863); Pertusaria dealbata f. corallina (L.) Cromb. (1894); Marfloraea corallina (L.) S.Y.Kondr. (2015); Thelotrema chioneum Ach. (1803); Pertusaria chionea (Ach.) DC. (1815); Porophora chionea (Ach.) Spreng. (1827); Parmelia cinerea var. chionea (Ach.) Nyl. (1852); Aspicilia cinerea var. chionea (Ach.) Räsänen (1939); Lichen variolarius DC. (1813); Isidium paradoxum Turner ex Hook. (1833); Isidium paradoxum Turner (1839); Pertusaria syncarpa var. corallina Mudd (1861)

= Lepra corallina =

Species of lichen-forming fungus

Lepra corallina is a species of saxicolous (rock-dwelling) crustose lichen in the family Pertusariaceae. First described by Carl Linnaeus in 1767 as Lichen corallinus, it was long known as Pertusaria corallina until molecular studies showed that Pertusaria in its traditional sense was not a natural group; the species was transferred to Lepra in 2016. The lichen forms a thick whitish to grey crust on acidic, lime-free rocks and is characterized by abundant coral-like isidia that often cover much of the surface. Fertile structures are rare. When present, they appear as small wart-like swellings containing a few apothecia with very large, two-spored asci. The lichen's chemistry is dominated by thamnolic acid, a secondary metabolite that contributes to its characteristic reactions to chemical tests.

Lepra corallina is widely distributed across temperate and boreal regions of the Northern Hemisphere, with records from western Europe, Scandinavia, Russia, Greenland, and eastern Asia. It grows mainly on steep or vertical faces of hard siliceous rock, from coastal outcrops to alpine ridges. The lichen actively weathers its rock substrate by excreting oxalic acid, which dissolves minerals and produces calcium oxalate crystals within the thallus. On manganese-rich ores it forms manganese oxalate, the first documented natural occurrence of that mineral. Field studies in Norway and Wales have shown it to be a habitat generalist and a relatively strong competitor, capable of overgrowing neighbouring crustose lichens, though its dominance can be transient. Established thalli also serve as hosts for several lichenicolous fungi.

== Taxonomy ==
The species was scientifically described by Carl Linnaeus in 1767 as Lichen corallinus. In the original description, Linnaeus characterized it as a white, densely tufted leprose lichen from rocks in Sweden and associated it with material received from Johan Zoëga. The original species epithet was corallinus; the now-familiar form corallina arose later when the species was transferred to genera treated as feminine.

Because no original Linnaean specimens of this saxicolous crust survive in the Linnaean Herbarium, Jørgensen, James, and Jarvis designated the Ehrhart-annotated specimen LINN 1273.17 as neotype in 1994, thereby fixing the application of the name to the species long known as Pertusaria corallina. During the nineteenth century the species passed through several genera, including Isidium and Variolaria, before Ferdinand Arnold published the combination Pertusaria corallina in 1861. That name remained the standard usage for more than a century.

Its present placement reflects the break-up of the traditional broad concept of Pertusaria. Molecular studies showed that Pertusaria in the broad sense was polyphyletic, and that the disc-bearing "Variolaria group", which includes this species, was more closely related to Ochrolechia and its allies than to Pertusaria in the strict sense. Beyond the molecular evidence, workers treating the "Variolaria group" as Lepra also pointed to a distinctive combination of characters. These characters include unusual disc-like ascomata that may become heavily pruinose, one- or two-spored asci, very large thin-walled ascospores, multilocular pycnidia with short rod-like conidia, and a chemistry lacking chlorinated xanthones and orcinol depsides. In 2015 the species was briefly recombined as Marfloraea corallina, but this treatment was not retained. Josef Hafellner transferred it to Lepra in 2016, using the older available generic name for the group. A subsequent proposal to conserve the familiar name Variolaria over Lepra was rejected by the General Committee in 2024, leaving Lepra in place.

Higher-level classifications of the genus have not been entirely consistent: some modern database-driven sources continue to place Lepra in Pertusariaceae, whereas specialist lichen treatments have placed it in Ochrolechiaceae, and Wei and coauthors left the genus as incertae sedis within Pertusariales pending further resolution.

== Description ==
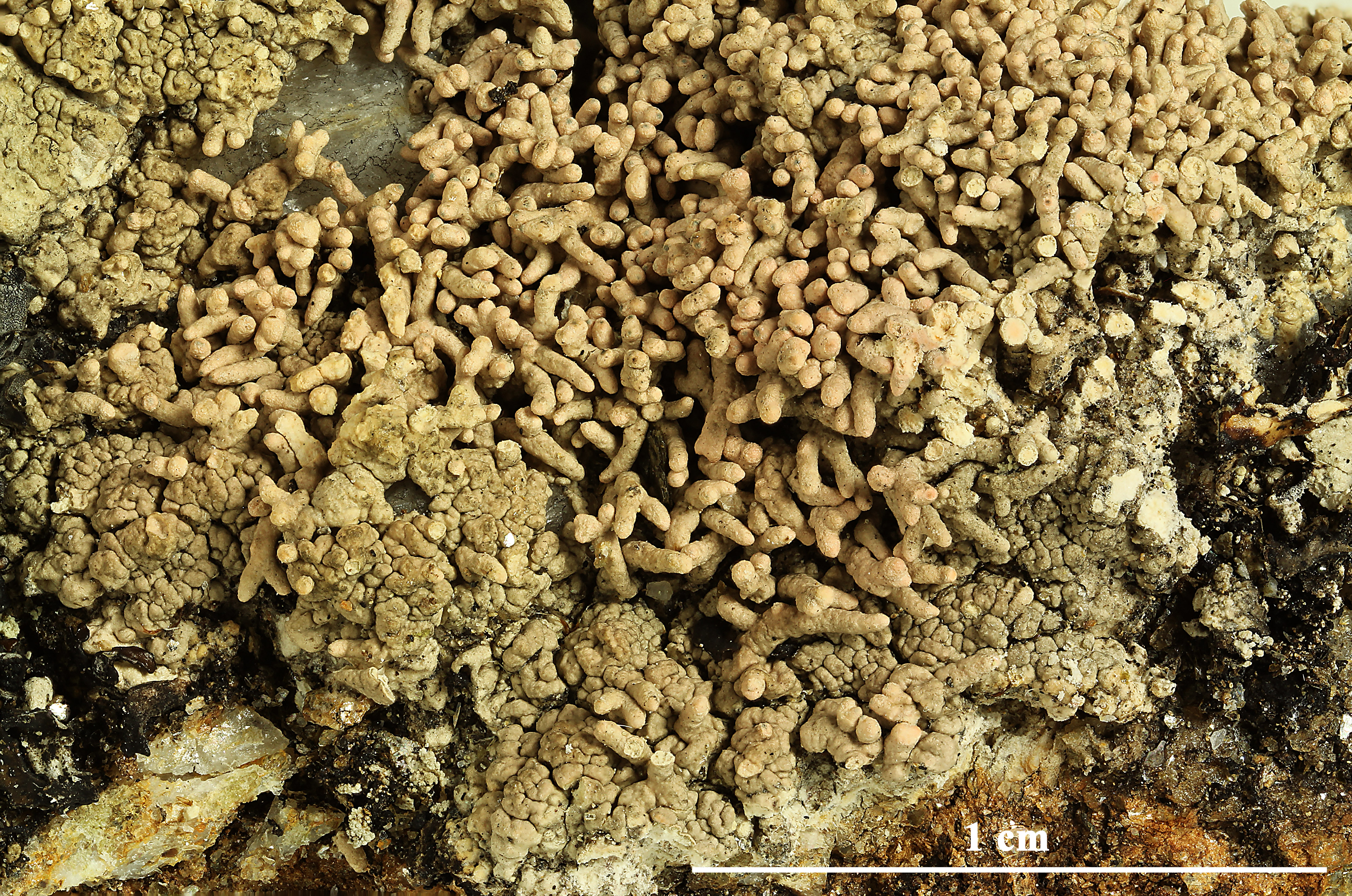
Close-up of the thallus of Lepra corallina, showing its dense, coral-like isidia and cracked crustose surface on siliceous rock

Lepra corallina forms a thick, crustose thallus that is pure white to pale or dark grey. The thallus is usually continuous but often cracked into small, irregular plates (rimose-areolate), and is bordered by a conspicuous white prothallus. It is characteristically covered by abundant isidia, 0.1–0.3 mm in diameter, which begin as simple cylindrical outgrowths and often become more branched and coral-like. These isidia are mostly erect or more or less lying flat on the surface, and may form a dense layer that obscures much of the underlying thallus. Fresh thalli of Lepra corallina are greyish white, but older parts often become more or less reddish with age, apparently reflecting variation in the concentration of thamnolic acid.

Fertile structures are rare. When present, they form wart-like swellings 1.5–2 mm in diameter that are strongly constricted at the base and often have an uneven or warted upper surface. Each of these warts contains a small group of apothecia, typically 2–4 but occasionally up to 11. The apothecial discs are relatively small (0.3–0.5 mm across), flat to slightly convex, pale to dark brown, and often faintly dusted with a white pruina. The asci in these apothecia usually contain two large ascospores, measuring 80–140 μm (occasionally up to 230 μm) × 40–80 μm, with a wall 2–3 μm thick that lacks any obvious zoning or striation.

In standard chemical spot tests (used to identify lichen substances) the thallus is C−, reacts K+ (yellow to yellow-orange), KC+ (yellow), and Pd+ (yellow-red), and is UV−. The main lichen substance detected is thamnolic acid.

=== Similar species ===
Lepra corallina may be confused superficially with Circinaria leprosescens, as both can have a pale grey thallus with granule-like or short isidioid outgrowths. Circinaria leprosescens, however, is a maritime, strongly nitrophilous species of siliceous seashore rocks, whereas L. corallina differs in habitat, reproductive structures, and chemistry, containing thamnolic acid. It may also be compared with Pertusaria rayana, an isidiate saxicolous crust known from humid montane habitats in Colorado, United States. The two share a superficially similar habit on vertical rock faces, but Lepra corallina differs in producing thamnolic acid and showing a Pd+ (yellow-orange), UV– chemical reaction. A more closely similar species is Pertusaria pseudocorallina, which differs in having a greyer thallus with shorter, granular to papillate isidia with brown tips rather than evenly coloured, coral-like outgrowths. In that species, broken isidia may leave small crater-like hollows on the thallus surface, and the chemistry is different: it contains norstictic acid rather than thamnolic acid.

== Habitat and distribution ==
Lepra corallina grows mainly on steep to vertical faces of hard, lime-free siliceous rock, from coastal outcrops to alpine elevations. It has been characterized as a Holarctic species of boreal to temperate, montane to alpine regions, widespread in the Alps—especially in wetter districts—though becoming sparser farther south in Italy. Although normally saxicolous, it has occasionally been recorded on an unusual substrate: an Austrian exsiccata specimen (Dupla Graecensia Lichenum no. 1145) documented it on dead remains of vascular plants and bryophytes on a windblown alpine ridge at 1,980 m, with typical rock-dwelling thalli on nearby boulders.

In Scotland, the species is described as widespread on basalt outcrops along the west coast. At Killundine near Lochaline in Argyll, it forms thick crusts on basalt at around 120 m elevation, incorporating small grains of the underlying rock into its thallus. At the Lecht mines in north-east Scotland it colonizes spoil tips of manganese–iron ore. Because the workings date from the early nineteenth century, the present thalli are at most about 180 years old, showing that the species can establish and persist on recently exposed, metal-rich substrates.

In Norway, Lepra corallina forms part of crustose lichen communities on hard siliceous bedrock, showing a marked preference for steep to vertical, carbonate-free faces where it occurs alongside species such as Ophioparma ventosa and Rhizocarpon geographicum. A study of a coastal community at Vingen in western Norway found it to be one of the common crustose lichens on Devonian sandstone from sea level to steep mountain ledges. Its frequency increased with distance from the shoreline and from the outer fjord, suggesting a preference for conditions that are still maritime but somewhat less exposed. Across gradients of radiation and microtopography it behaved largely as a habitat generalist, occurring on a wide range of rock faces and usually surrounded by relatively dense cover of other lichens, bryophytes, and vascular plants.

Elsewhere in Europe, the lichen has been recorded from three sites on acidic granite and gneiss in the Ballons des Vosges Nature Park in north-eastern France, and a 2025 floristic note reported it as new to Veneto and confirmed it from several alpine localities in Piemonte. A 2022 national checklist added it to the lichen flora of Bulgaria, based on a record from the Forebalkan floristic region, extending its documented range into south-eastern Europe. It had earlier been recorded as new to Russia from the Khanty-Mansi Autonomous Okrug.

Beyond Europe, records from South Greenland published in 2009 extended the species' range into the subarctic North Atlantic. In eastern Asia it has been recorded from Fujian and Yunnan in China, where it grows mainly on siliceous rocks in upland areas and only rarely on bark, and from South Korea.

== Ecology ==
=== Rock weathering and mineral interactions ===
Lepra corallina actively weathers the rock surfaces it colonizes. Detailed microscopic work on Scottish material has shown that the fungal partner excretes oxalic acid, which dissolves calcium and other elements from basalt and leads to the formation of tiny plate-like calcium oxalate crystals within the thallus. At the lichen–rock interface, common basalt minerals such as labradorite feldspar and dark iron-rich silicates become heavily etched and break down into a thin ochre-coloured crust of poorly ordered iron- and aluminium-rich material mixed with organic matter. Experimental treatments of these minerals with oxalic acid and with an oxalate-producing soil fungus produced similar etching and secondary products, confirming that oxalic acid from the lichen is largely responsible for the observed weathering.

This chemical interaction can also involve rarer elements. On manganese ore from the Lecht mines in Scotland, the lichen produces abundant microscopic crystals of manganese oxalate dihydrate (containing some zinc), formed where excreted oxalic acid reacts with manganese released from the ore. This was the first documented natural occurrence of manganese oxalate. The authors suggest that locking manganese into this insoluble form may help the lichen tolerate otherwise toxic concentrations of heavy metals, and that similar metal oxalate minerals are likely to form wherever oxalate-producing crustose lichens colonize rocks and ores of unusual composition.

A later study of sandstone-inhabiting thalli in western Norway found that Lepra corallina contained whewellite (calcium oxalate monohydrate) in some thallus samples, but not in the underlying weathering rind. The same study detected thamnolic acid in the thallus but not in the rock beneath it, suggesting that in this species the principal lichen substances are largely confined to the thallus above the lichen-rock interface. Compared with some co-occurring crustose lichens on the same sandstone, L. corallina showed a lower occurrence of whewellite in the thallus, and no lichen substances were detected in the weathered rock below it.

=== Associated microorganisms ===
Molecular surveys of Norwegian material indicate that the bacterial community associated with L. corallina is broadly similar to those of co-occurring crustose lichens, being dominated by Acidobacteriota, Alphaproteobacteria, Betaproteobacteria, and members of the Chloroflexota. Among the species studied, however, it supported the lowest overall abundance of bacterial cells in both the thallus and the weathered rock immediately beneath it. The authors suggest that thamnolic acid, the main secondary metabolite in the thallus, may partly account for this, complementing the physical protection provided by the endolithic zone at the lichen–rock interface.

=== Competition and dispersal ===
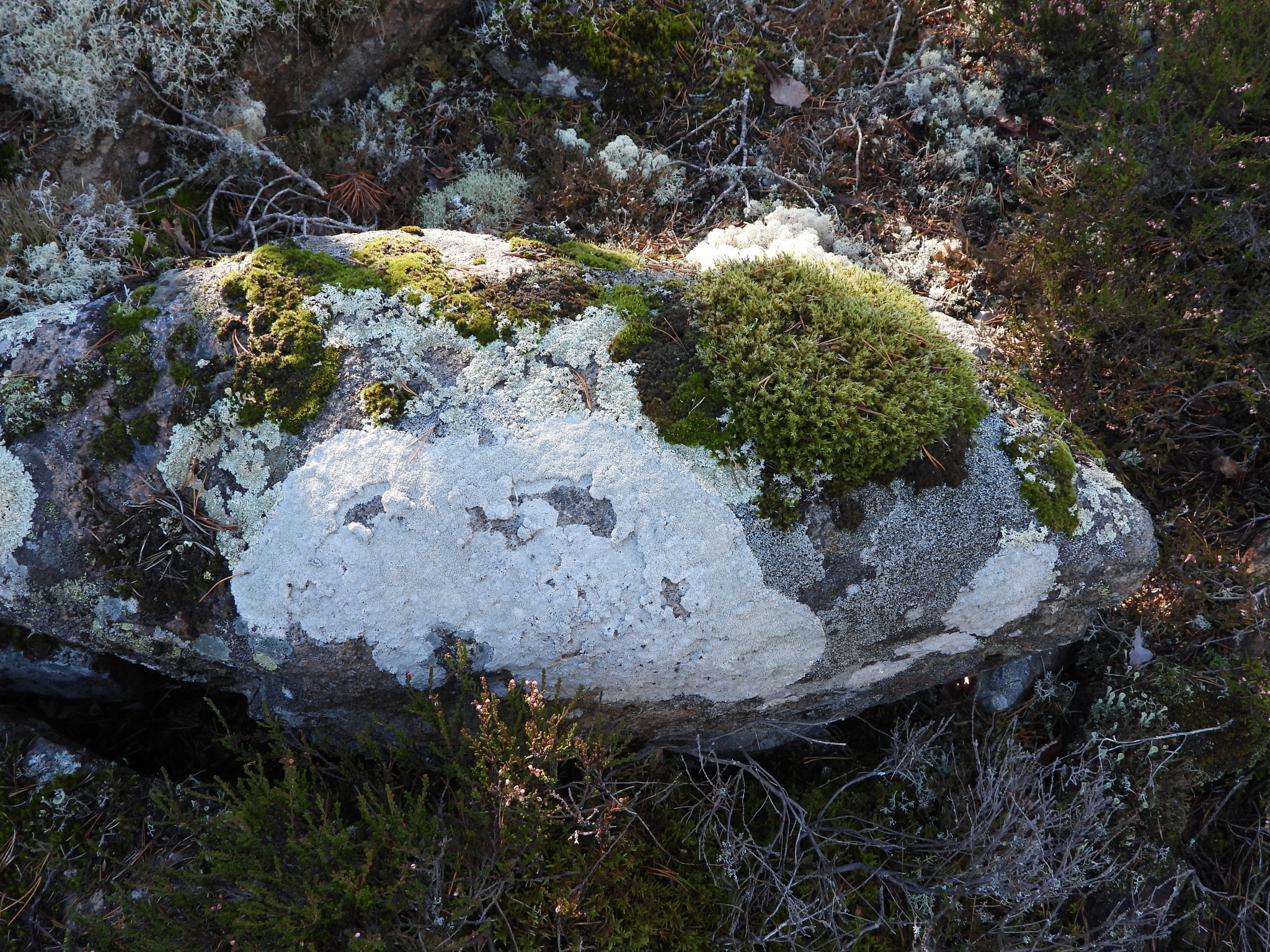
Lichen community on siliceous rock in Finland, including extensive pale thalli of Lepra corallina among mosses and other saxicolous lichens

Field studies suggest that Lepra corallina is a habitat generalist and a relatively strong competitor for space on rock surfaces. Fine-scale vegetation surveys at Vingen in western Norway found that, unlike some co-occurring crustose lichens whose frequency declined as surrounding vegetation cover increased, L. corallina was least common on nearly bare rock and became more frequent where neighbouring lichens and plants occupied a large proportion of the substrate. This pattern, together with its frequent contact zones with other species, suggests it is effective at claiming and holding space.

Its abundant isidia may contribute to this success. Because these vegetative propagules carry both the fungal partner and its photobiont (the photosynthetic algal partner), new thalli can establish without needing to find a compatible alga on the rock surface—an advantage over species that rely mainly on ascospores for dispersal, and a possible explanation for the persistent populations and extensive crusts L. corallina builds on suitable coastal sandstone.

On rhyolite tuff boulders in the Llanberis Pass of north Wales, Lepra corallina behaves as a vigorous invader of established crustose lichen mosaics dominated by Fuscidea and related genera, its advancing margin overgrowing and temporarily replacing the smaller resident crusts. However, this advantage proves transient: as older parts of the thallus age and break down, they open "windows" of bare rock that are recolonized by the original Fuscidea-dominated community rather than by L. corallina itself.

In southern France, Lepra corallina occurs in acidophilous rock-dwelling lichen communities on hard siliceous rocks, especially gneiss and quartzitic sandstone. In the submediterranean Languedoc region it was recorded in the Fuscideetum lygaeae, a community of largely north-facing vertical rock faces that are well lit but sheltered from direct sun and strong desiccation. The species has also given its name to the Pertusarietum corallinae, a related acidophilous community centred on Lepra corallina and allied crustose lichens.

=== Lichenicolous fungi ===
Lepra corallina also serves as a host for lichenicolous (lichen-dwelling) fungi. In the Ballons des Vosges, it was recorded with Cornutispora intermedia, Sclerococcum sphaerale, and Spirographa fusisporella, showing that established thalli can support a small associated fungal biota of their own. Italian records of Sclerococcum sphaerale from various regions show that this lichenicolous fungus occurs on Lepra corallina across a broad span of Italian mountain regions; the same source described L. corallina as its most common host.

== See also ==
- List of lichens named by Carl Linnaeus
