= Lepra =

Lepra may refer to:

- Lepra, a UK-based international charity
- Lepra, a genus of lichens
