= Rhenium disulfide =

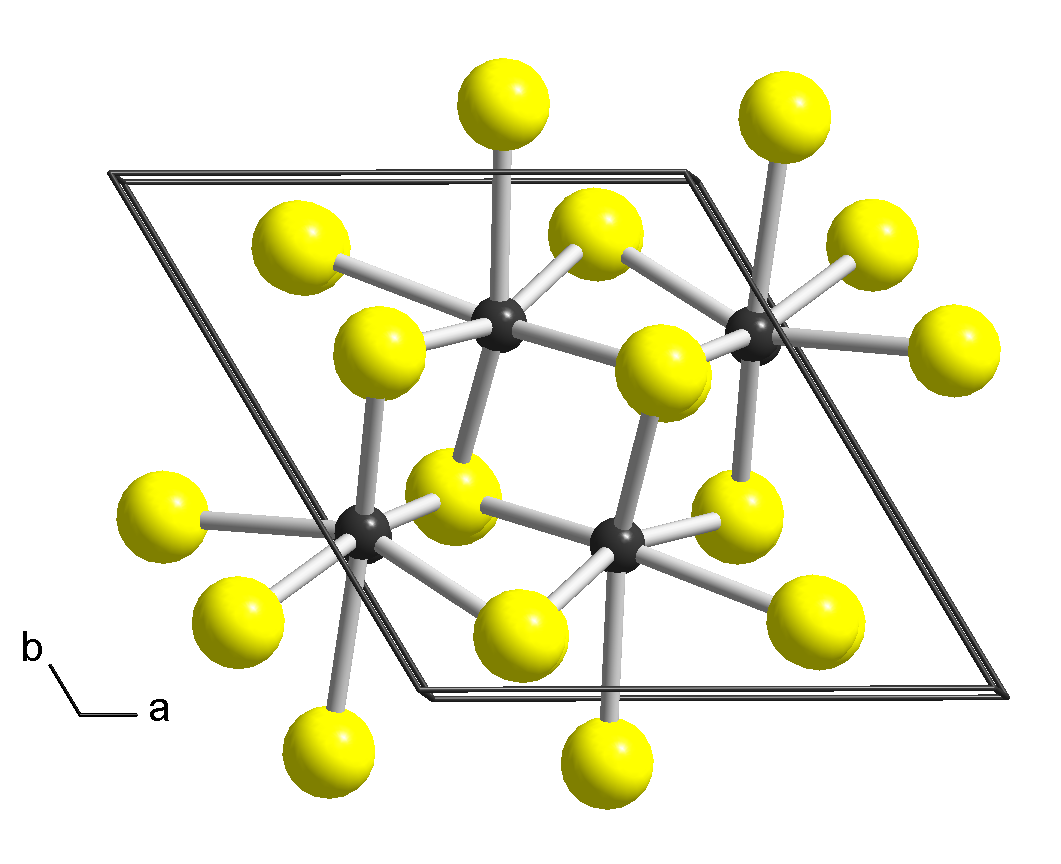

Names
- IUPAC name Bis(sulfanylidene)rhenium
- Other names Rhenium(IV) sulfide

Identifiers
CAS Number	12038-63-0
3D model (JSmol)	Interactive image
ChemSpider	74775
ECHA InfoCard	100.031.695
EC Number	234-878-3
PubChem CID	82864
CompTox Dashboard (EPA)	DTXSID7065201
- InChI: InChI=1S/Re.2S Key: USWJSZNKYVUTIE-UHFFFAOYSA-N
- SMILES: S=[Re]=S

Properties
Chemical formula	ReS_{2}
Molar mass	250.337 g/mol
Odor	odorless
Density	7.6 g/cm^{3}
Solubility in water	insoluble

Structure
Crystal structure	Triclinic, aP12, space group P1̅, No 2
Lattice constant	a = 0.6352 nm, b = 0.6446 nm, c = 1.2779 nm α = 91.51°, β = 105.17°, γ = 118.97°
Formula units (Z)	8

Related compounds
Other anions	Rhenium(IV) oxide Rhenium diselenide Rhenium ditelluride
Other cations	Manganese diselenide
- Except where otherwise noted, data are given for materials in their standard state (at 25 °C [77 °F], 100 kPa). Infobox references

Rhenium disulfide is an inorganic compound of rhenium and sulfur with the formula ReS_{2}. It has a layered structure where atoms are strongly bonded within each layer. The layers are held together by weak Van der Waals bonds, and can be easily peeled off from the bulk material.

== Production ==
ReS_{2} is found in nature as the mineral rheniite. It can be synthesized from the reaction between rhenium and sulfur at 1000 °C, or the decomposition of rhenium(VII) sulfide at 1100 °C:

Re + 2 S → ReS_{2}
Re_{2}S_{7} → 2 ReS_{2} + 3 S

Nanostructured ReS_{2} can usually be achieved through mechanical exfoliation, chemical vapor deposition (CVD), and chemical and liquid exfoliations. Larger crystals can be grown with the assistance of liquid carbonate flux at high pressure. It is widely used in electronic and optoelectronic device, energy storage, photocatalytic and electrocatalytic reactions.

== Properties ==
It is a two-dimensional (2D) group VII transition metal dichalcogenide (TMD). ReS_{2} was isolated down to monolayers which is only one unit cell in thickness for the first time in 2014. These monolayers have shown layer-independent electrical, optical, and vibrational properties much different from other TMDs.

== Structure ==
Bulk ReS_{2} has a layered structure and a platelet-like habit. Different crystal structures were proposed for ReS_{2} based on single-crystal X-ray diffraction studies. While all authors agree that the lattice is triclinic, the reported cell parameters and atomic arrangements slightly differ. The earliest work describes ReS_{2} in a triclinic unit cell (sp. gr. P$\bar{1}$, a = 0.6455 nm, b = 0.6362 nm, c = 0.6401 nm, α = 105.04°, β = 91.60°, γ = 118.97°) as a distorted variant of the CdCl_{2} prototype (1T structure, trigonal space group R$\bar{3}$m). In comparison with ideal octahedral coordination of the metal atoms in CdCl_{2}, the Re atoms in ReS_{2} are displaced from the centers of the surrounding Se_{6} octahedra and form Re_{4} clusters that are linked to chains in the b direction. A later study proposed a more accurate description of the crystal structure. It reports a different triclinic cell (sp. gr. P$\bar{1}$, a = 0.6352 nm, b = 0.6446 nm, c = 1.2779 nm, α = 91.51°, β = 105.17°, γ = 118.97°) with the doubled c parameter and swapped a and b, α and β. There are two layers in this unit cell, related by symmetry centers, and the chains of clusters run along the a axis. Each layer form parallelogram-shaped connected clusters with Re-Re distances of ca. 0.27-0.28 nm in the cluster, and ca. 0.29 nm between clusters. There is one more structure description of ReS_{2} published in in yet another triclinic cell (sp. gr. P$\bar{1}$, a = 0.6417 nm, b = 0.6510 nm, c = 0.6461 nm, α = 121.10°, β = 88.38°, γ = 106.47°) where only one layer is present and the centers of symmetry are in the Re layer. The current consent is that the latter work might have overlooked the doubling of the c parameter captured in.

Recent experiments in a laser-heated diamond anvil cell produced a denser polymorph of ReS_{2} which was then recovered to ambient conditions of pressure and temperature upon decompression.

== Natural Occurrence ==
Rhenium disulfide is known in nature as the very rare mineral rheniite.
