= Rhenium diselenide =

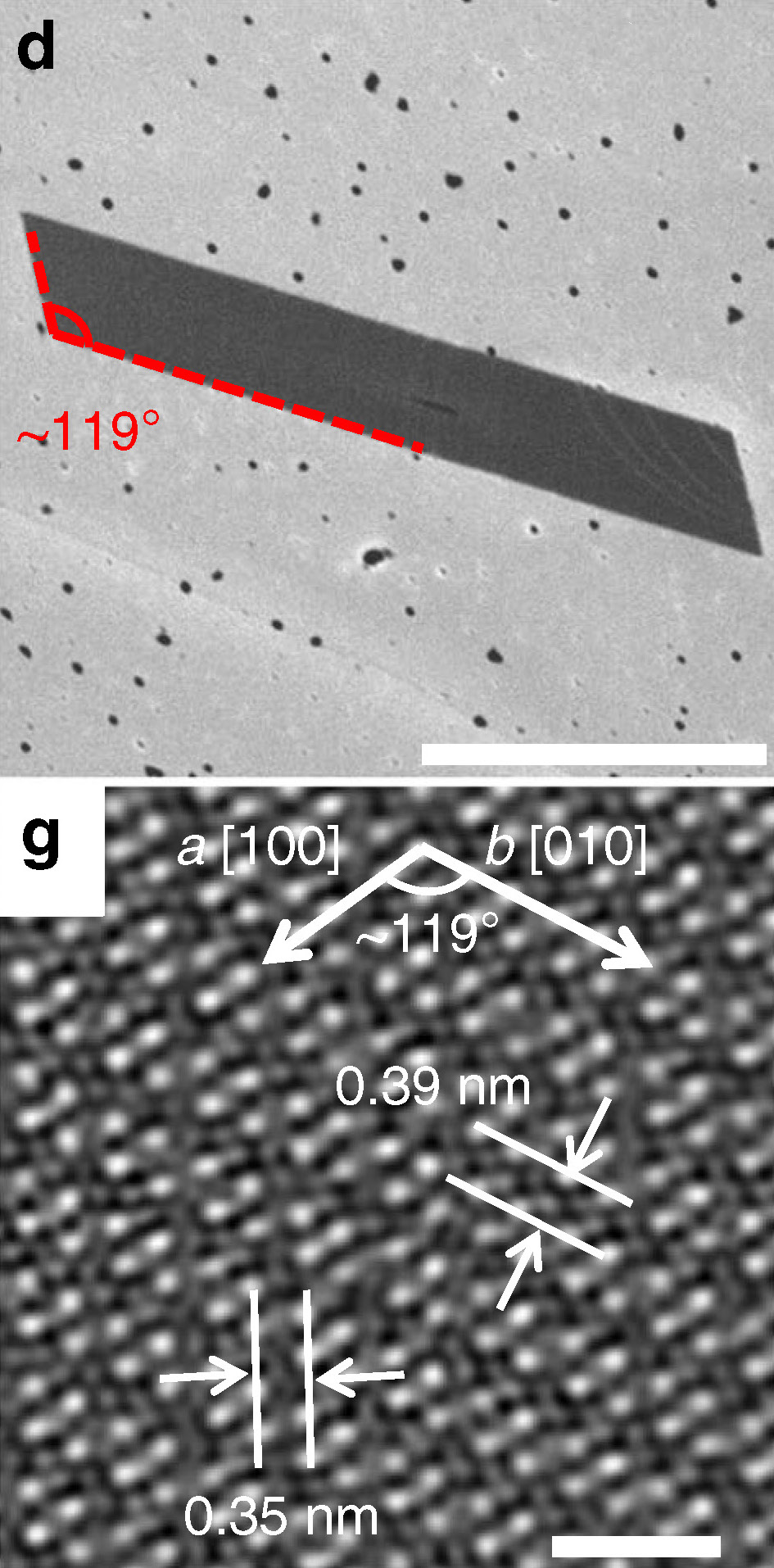
- d: SEM micrograph of a typical parallelogram-shaped ReSe_{2} flake, scale bar 1 µm. g: top view of the ReSe_{2} atomic lattice

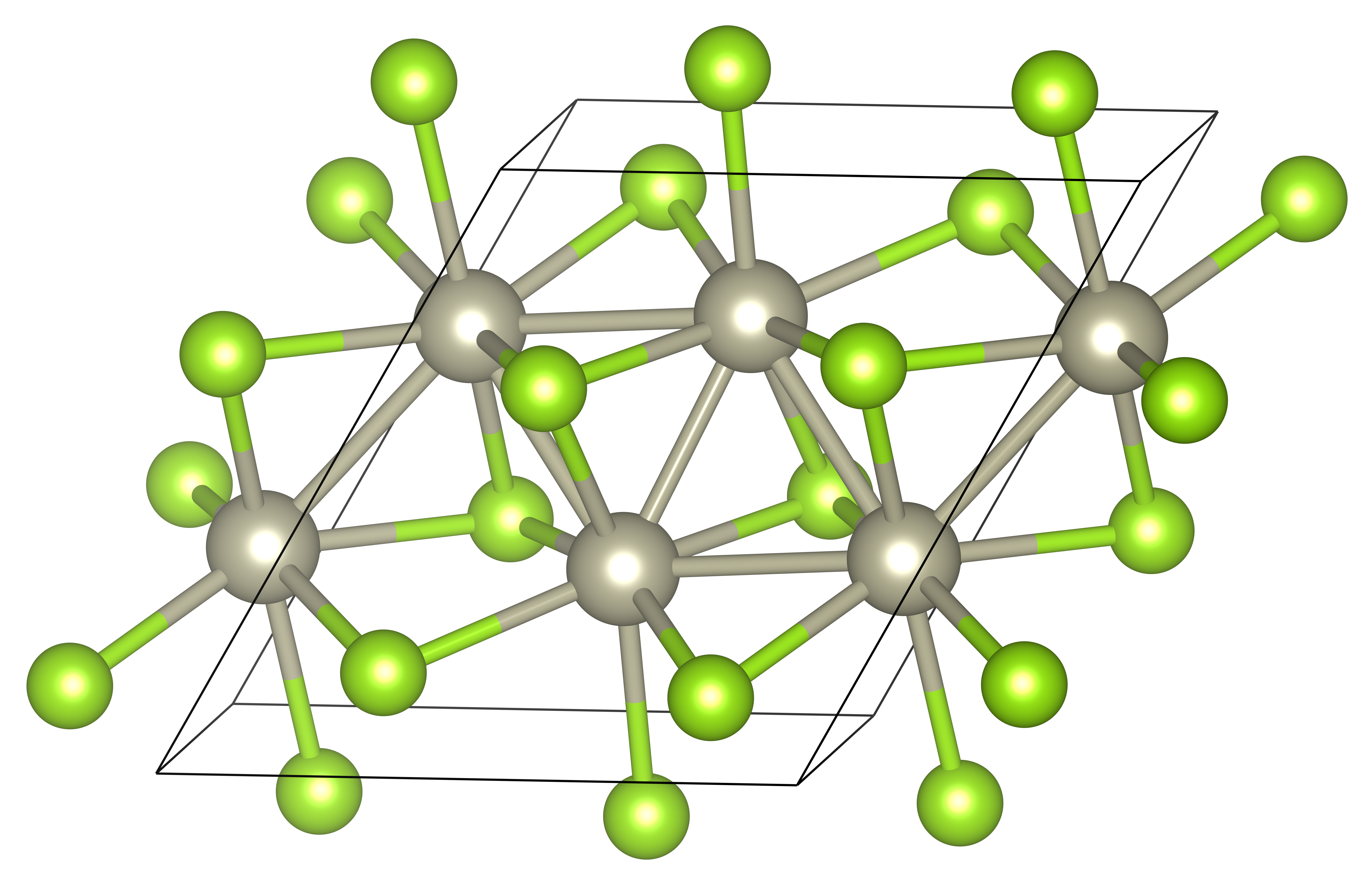
- Unit cell of rhenium diselenide.

Names
- IUPAC name Bis(selanylidene)rhenium
- Other names Rhenium(IV) selenide

Identifiers
CAS Number	12038-64-1
3D model (JSmol)	Interactive image
ChemSpider	74776
ECHA InfoCard	100.031.696
EC Number	234-879-9
PubChem CID	82865
CompTox Dashboard (EPA)	DTXSID2065202
- InChI: InChI=1S/2Se.Re Key: CUYHGAIVHCHFIA-UHFFFAOYSA-N
- SMILES: [Se]=[Re]=[Se]

Properties
Chemical formula	ReSe_{2}
Molar mass	344.13 g/mol
Odor	odorless
Density	9.22 g/cm^{3}
Solubility in water	insoluble
Band gap	~1.2 eV (300 K), indirect

Structure
Crystal structure	Triclinic, aP12, space group P1̅, No 2
Lattice constant	a = 0.6602 nm, b = 0.6716 nm, c = 0.6728 nm α = 91.82°, β = 104.9°, γ = 118.94°
Formula units (Z)	4

Related compounds
Other anions	Rhenium(IV) oxide Rhenium disulfide Rhenium ditelluride
Other cations	Manganese diselenide
- Except where otherwise noted, data are given for materials in their standard state (at 25 °C [77 °F], 100 kPa). Infobox references

Rhenium diselenide is an inorganic compound with the formula ReSe_{2}. It has a layered structure where atoms are strongly bonded within each layer. The layers are held together by weak Van der Waals bonds, and can be easily peeled off from the bulk material.

== Synthesis ==
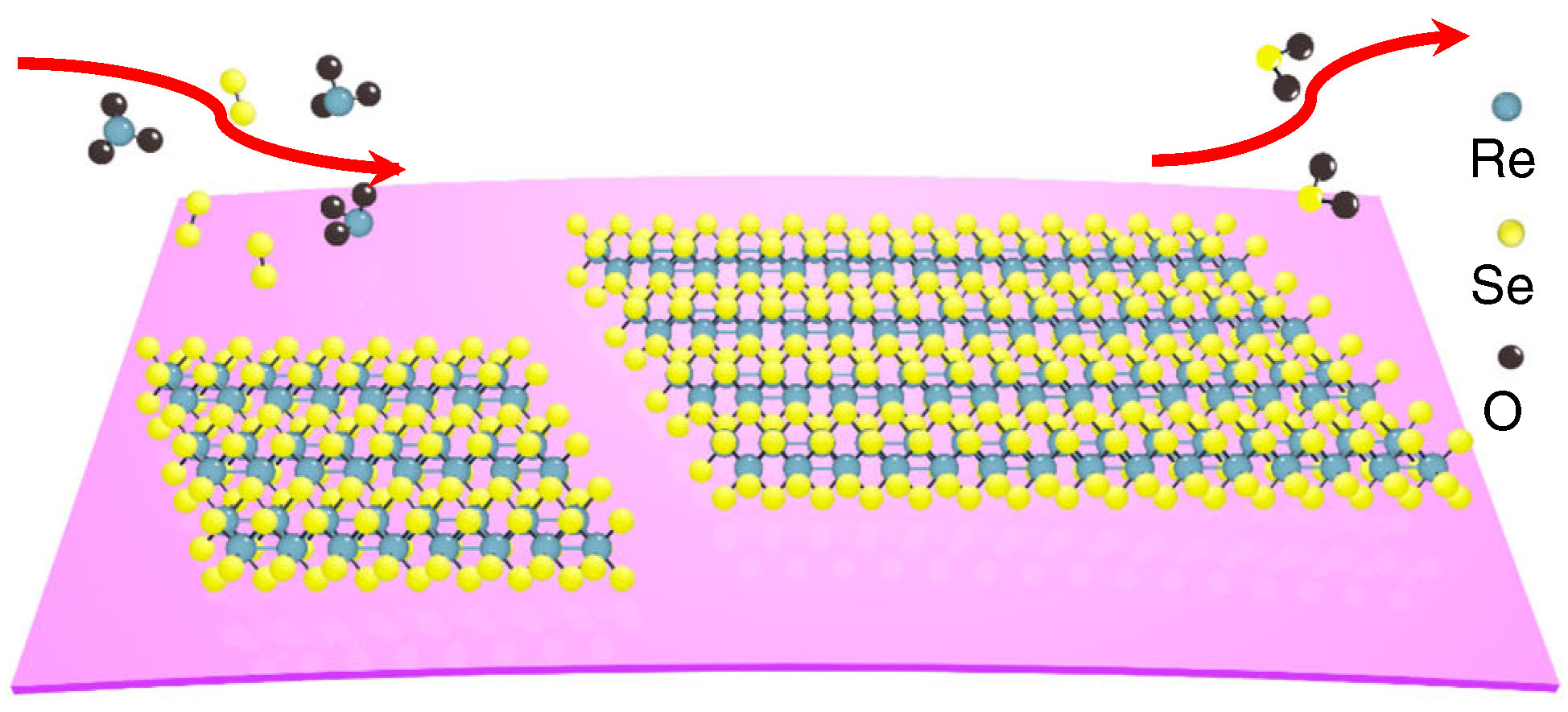
Schematic of the ReSe_{2} growth from Se and ReO_{3}

Rhenium diselenide with a thickness as small as a triple-atomic layer can be produced by chemical vapor deposition at ambient pressure. A mixture of Ar and hydrogen gases is flown through a tube whose ends are kept at different temperatures. The substrate and ReO_{3} powder are placed at the hot end which is heated to 750 °C, and selenium powder is located at the cold end which is kept at 250 °C.

2 ReO_{3} + 7 Se → 2 ReSe_{2} + 3 SeO_{2}

== Properties ==
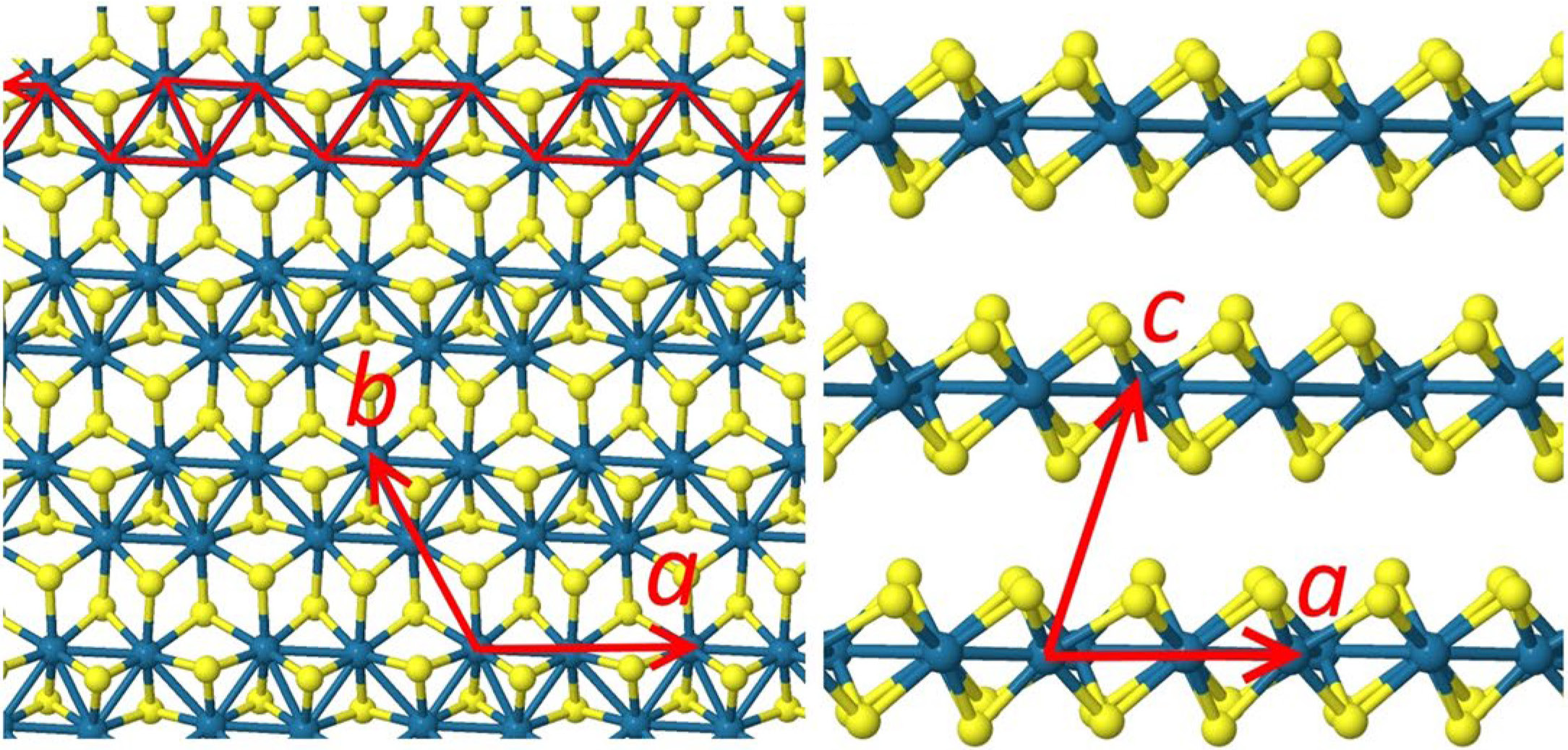
Top view (left) and side view (right) of the ReSe_{2} lattice

As most other dichalcogenides of transition metals, rhenium diselenide has a layered structure where atoms are strongly bonded within each layer and the layers are held together by weak Van der Waals bonds. However, while most other layered dichalcogenides have a high (hexagonal) symmetry, ReSe_{2} has a very low triclinic symmetry, and this symmetry does not change from the bulk to monolayers.
