= Manganese(II) oxide =

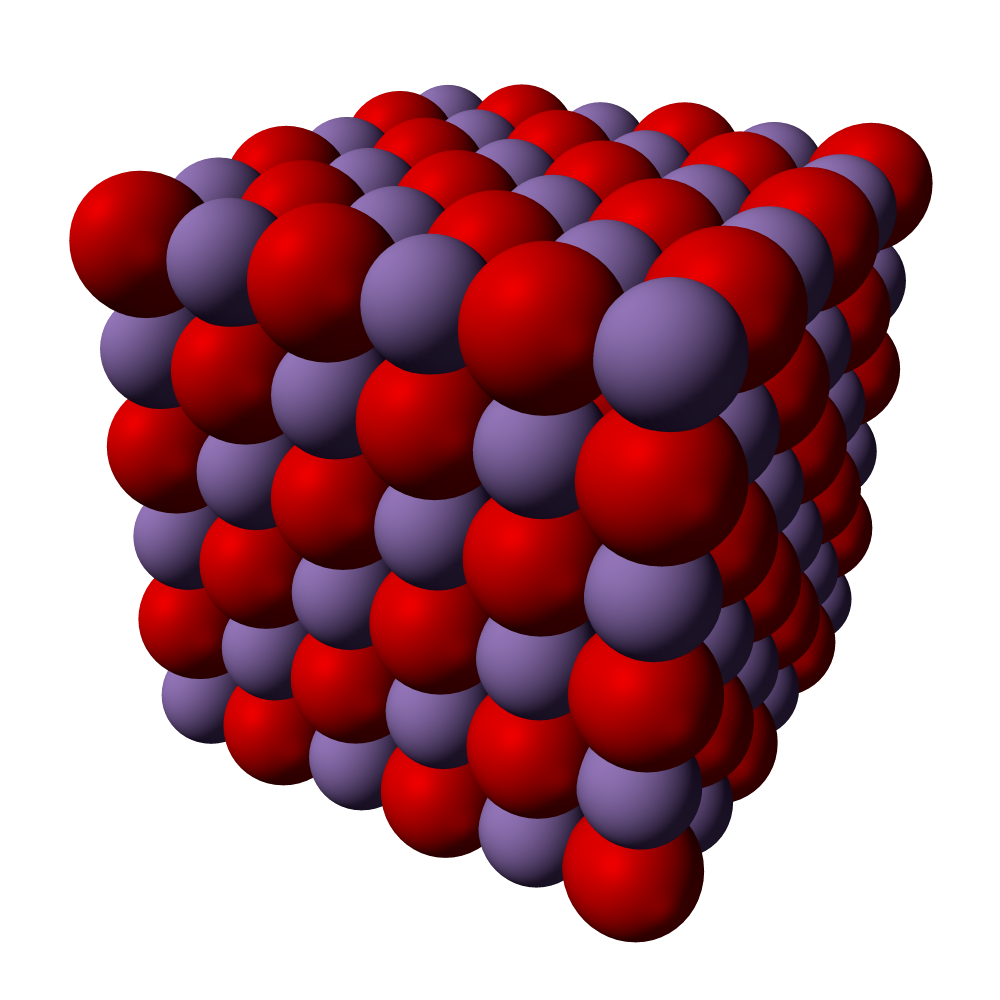
- Manganese(II) oxide

Names
- IUPAC name Manganese(II) oxide
- Other names Manganous oxide Manganosite manganese monoxide oxomanganese

Identifiers
CAS Number	1344-43-0
3D model (JSmol)	Interactive image
ChemSpider	14234
ECHA InfoCard	100.014.269
EC Number	215-695-8
PubChem CID	14940
RTECS number	OP0900000
UNII	64J2OA7MH3
CompTox Dashboard (EPA)	DTXSID5042110
- InChI: InChI=1S/Mn.O Key: VASIZKWUTCETSD-UHFFFAOYSA-N
- SMILES: [Mn+2].[O-2]

Properties
Chemical formula	MnO
Molar mass	70.9374 g/mol
Appearance	green crystals or powder
Density	5.43 g/cm^{3}
Melting point	1,945 °C (3,533 °F; 2,218 K)
Solubility in water	insoluble
Solubility	soluble in acid
Magnetic susceptibility (χ)	+4850.0·10^{−6} cm^{3}/mol
Refractive index (n_{D})	2.16

Structure
Crystal structure	Halite (cubic), cF8
Space group	Fm3̅m, No. 225
Coordination geometry	Octahedral (Mn^{2+}); octahedral (O^{2−})

Thermochemistry
Std molar entropy (S^{⦵}_{298})	60 J·mol^{−1}·K^{−1}
Std enthalpy of formation (Δ_{f}H^{⦵}_{298})	−385 kJ·mol^{−1}

Hazards
NFPA 704 (fire diamond)	1 0 0
Flash point	Non-flammable

Related compounds
Other anions	Manganese(II) fluoride Manganese(II) sulfide Manganese(II) selenide Manganese(II) telluride
Other cations	Iron(II) oxide
Related manganese oxides	Manganese(II,III) oxide Manganese(III) oxide Manganese dioxide Manganese heptoxide
- Except where otherwise noted, data are given for materials in their standard state (at 25 °C [77 °F], 100 kPa). verify (what is ?) Infobox references

Manganese(II) oxide is an inorganic compound with chemical formula MnO. It forms green crystals. The compound is produced on a large scale as a component of fertilizers and food additives.

== Structure, stoichiometry, reactivity ==
Like many metal monoxides, MnO adopts the rock salt structure, where cations and anions are both octahedrally coordinated. Also like many metal oxides, manganese(II) oxide is often nonstoichiometric: its composition can vary from MnO to MnO_{1.045}.

Manganese(II) oxide undergoes the chemical reactions typical of an ionic oxide. Upon treatment with acids, it converts to the corresponding manganese(II) salt. Oxidation of manganese(II) oxide gives manganese(III) oxide.

== Preparation and occurrence ==
MnO occurs in nature as the rare mineral manganosite.
It is prepared commercially by reduction of MnO_{2} with hydrogen, carbon monoxide, or methane, e.g.:

MnO_{2} + H_{2} → MnO + H_{2}O
MnO_{2} + CO → MnO + CO_{2}

Upon heating to 450 °C, manganese(II) nitrate gives a mixture of oxides, denoted MnO_{2−x}, which can be reduced to the monoxide with hydrogen at ≥750 °C. MnO is particularly stable and resists further reduction. MnO can also be prepared by heating the carbonate:

MnCO_{3} → MnO + CO_{2}

This calcining process is conducted anaerobically, lest Mn_{2}O_{3} form.

An alternative route, most interest for demonstration purposes, is the "oxalate method". Also applicable to the synthesis of ferrous oxide and stannous oxide, it entails heating in an oxygen-free atmosphere (often CO_{2}), hydrated manganese(II) oxalate:

MnC_{2}O_{4}·2H_{2}O → MnO + CO_{2} + CO + 2 H_{2}O

== Applications ==
Together with manganese sulfate, MnO is a component of fertilizers and food additives. Many thousands of tons are consumed annually for this purpose. Other uses include: a catalyst in the manufacture of allyl alcohol, pigmenting ceramics and paints, coloring glass, bleaching tallow, and textile printing.

== Magnetism ==
Below 118 K, MnO is antiferromagnetic. MnO has the distinction of being one of the first compounds to have its magnetic structure determined by neutron diffraction, the report appearing in 1951. This study showed that the Mn^{2+} ions form a face centered cubic magnetic sub-lattice where there are ferromagnetically coupled sheets that are anti-parallel with adjacent sheets.

== Electronic structure ==
Similar to NiO, MnO is classed as a strongly correlated material because of the localised 3d states associated with Mn atoms, and is an electrical insulator. Conventional approximations to the exchange-correlation functional in density functional theory (DFT) such as the local spin-density approximation (LSDA) severely underestimate the band gap of the material, and can even predict it to be metallic, depending on the choice of magnetic configuration. However, improved descriptions of the material's electronic structure, such as hybrid exchange-correlation functionals, DFT+U, the GW approximation, self-interaction corrected DFT, or coupled cluster theory, all recover the band gap with significantly improved accuracy. It has also been shown that such improved methods predict a band gap regardless of the choice of magnetic state.
