= Manganese(II) telluride =

- Mn^{2+} Te^{2−}

Names
- IUPAC name Manganese(II) telluride

Identifiers
CAS Number	12032-88-1
3D model (JSmol)	Interactive image
ChemSpider	21241538
ECHA InfoCard	100.031.607
EC Number	234-782-1
PubChem CID	82828
CompTox Dashboard (EPA)	DTXSID001014212
- InChI: InChI=1S/Mn.Te Key: VMINMXIEZOMBRH-UHFFFAOYSA-N
- SMILES: [Mn]=[Te]

Properties
Chemical formula	MnTe
Molar mass	182.54 g/mol
Appearance	dark gray
Density	6 g/cm^{3}
Melting point	1,150 °C (2,100 °F; 1,420 K) approximation
Solubility in water	insoluble

Structure
Crystal structure	Hexagonal (NiAs), hP4
Space group	P6_{3}/mmc (No. 194)
Lattice constant	a = 412 pm, c = 670 pm
Formula units (Z)	2

Related compounds
Other anions	Manganese(II) oxide Manganese(II) sulfide Manganese(II) selenide
- Except where otherwise noted, data are given for materials in their standard state (at 25 °C [77 °F], 100 kPa). Infobox references

Manganese(II) telluride is an inorganic compound with the chemical formula MnTe. It is a gray solid obtained by the reaction of the elements.

== Properties ==
Manganese telluride crystallizes in the NaCl structure motif.

Long thought to be antiferromagnetic, manganese telluride has been determined to be altermagnetic. It has a Néel temperature of 307 K, meaning it does not need exotic temperatures to maintain its altermagnetic ordering.
