= Altermagnetism =

Type of magnetic state

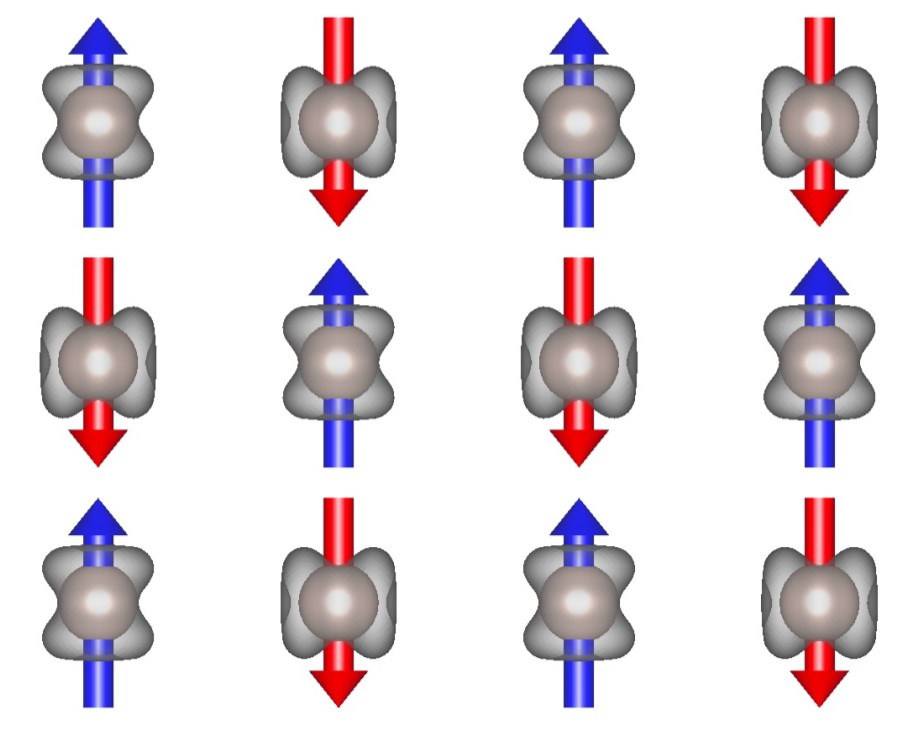
An example of an altermagnetic ordering, with the direction of the spins and the spatial orientation of the atoms alternating on the neighbouring sites in the crystal.

In condensed matter physics, altermagnetism is a type of persistent magnetic state in ideal crystals. Altermagnetic structures are collinear and crystal-symmetry compensated, resulting in zero net magnetisation. Unlike in a PT-symmetric collinear antiferromagnet, the electronic bands in PT-non-symmetric antiferromagnets (altermagnets) are not Kramers degenerate, but instead depend on the wavevector in a spin-dependent way due to the intrinsic crystal symmetry connecting different magnetic sublattices. Related to this feature, key experimental observations were published in 2024. It has been speculated that altermagnetism may have applications in the field of spintronics.

== Connection of altermagnetism to antiferromagnetism ==
It has been noted in that altermagnetism is best understood by a spin-splitting of quasiparticles in a subset of collinear antiferromagnets that largely overlaps with piezomagnets and weak ferromagnets. It can also refer to noncollinear antiferromagnets with spin-splitting.

Collinear antiferromagnets are Néel-ordered magnets whose magnetic sublattices are related to each other by a combination of symmetries. There are PT-symmetric antiferromagnets, in which magnetic sublattices are connected by translation and/or inversion, and time-reversal operations. Such antiferromagnets are rare in Nature. In most antiferromagnets this symmetry is broken, and the magnetic sublattices are connected by a symmetry operation combining rotation, mirror reflection, or both, with time-reversal. The spin-splitting of quasiparticles, i.e. the altermagnetism, occurs in this class of antiferromagnets. Such antiferromagnets were experimentally discovered in 1958 by A.S. Borovik-Romanov group when observing weak ferromagnetism in collinear antiferromagnets. I.E. Dzyaloshinskii developed the symmetry-based thermodynamic theory of weak ferromagnetism in 1958, which was later microscopically expanded by T. Moriya via the Dzyaloshinskii-Moriya interaction. E.A. Turov classified all antiferromagnets for all symmetry classes using magnetic space groups. Importantly, it is understood that PT-symmetry must be broken in collinear antiferromagnets for weak ferromagnetism and piezomagnetism to occur. Weak ferromagnets might not necessarily have canting of the Néel order. It is rather broken PT-symmetry and other symmetries that define a weak ferromagnet and piezomagnet.

The spin-splitting effect in collinear antiferromagnets—initially predicted in 2016-2018 by T. Okugawa, K. Ohno, Y. Noda, and S. Nakamura —was subsequently generalized across a broader class of collinear magnetic systems leading to diverse nomenclature such as d-wave, g-wave, i-wave, and mirror-symmetric spin-splitting. These types of spin-splitting correspond to how the magnetic sublattices connect to each other. However, such spin-splitting also appears in compensated ferrimagnets. This implies that altermagnetism is a spin-splitting property of Néel-ordered magnets rather than a new state of matter.

The apparent novelty of altermagnets as being the third class of magnetically ordered systems was debated (for example, this was noted in); it stems from applying spin group theory, rather than magnetic space group theory, to the already understood set of collinear and non-collinear antiferromagnets. For example, despite being a traditional manifestation of piezomagnetism and weak ferromagnetism, a collinear antiferromagnet on a rutile lattice has recently been rebranded into an altermagnet. Or, hematite, the cornerstone of weak ferromagnetism, has recently been relabeled as a g-wave altermagnet. On the other hand, the field of altermagnetism has brought about the knowledge of antiferromagnetic spin-splitting of quasiparticles in collinear antiferromagnets.

== Crystal structure and symmetry ==
In altermagnetic materials, atoms form a regular pattern with alternating spin and spatial orientation at adjacent magnetic sites in the crystal.

Atoms with opposite magnetic moment are in altermagnets coupled by crystal rotation or mirror symmetry. The spatial orientation of magnetic atoms may originate from the surrounding cages of non-magnetic atoms. The opposite spin sublattices in altermagnetic manganese telluride (MnTe) are related by spin rotation combined with six-fold crystal rotation and half-unit cell translation. Ruthenium dioxide (RuO_{2}) was claimed to be an altermagnet, but it was later confirmed in two independent studies that it is completely non-magnetic.

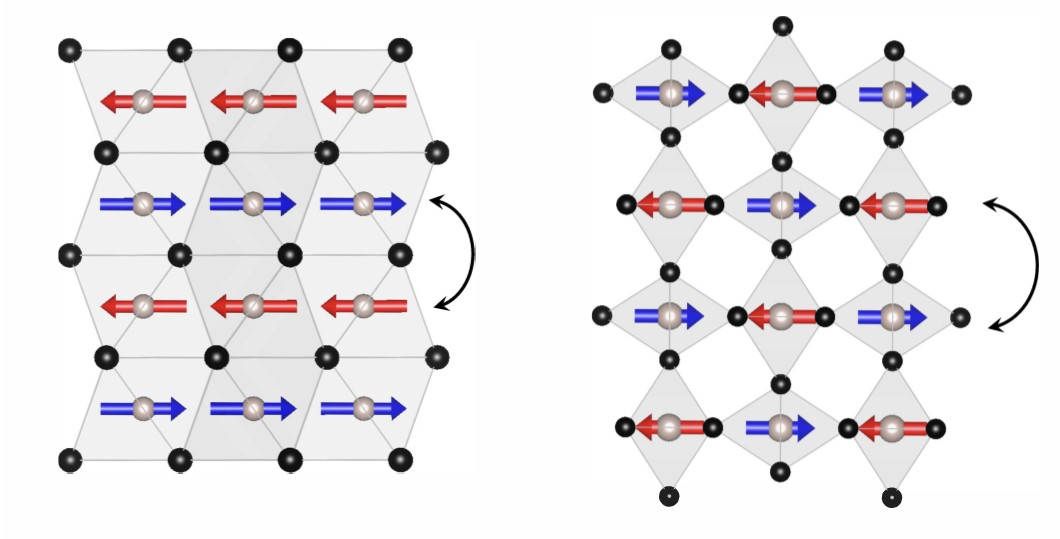
Alternating magnetic and crystal pattern in altermagnetic manganese telluride (MnTe, left) and suggested magnetic structure for ruthenium dioxide (RuO_{2}, right), which however later turned out to be non-magnetic.

== Electronic structure ==
One of the distinctive features of altermagnets is a specifically spin-split band structure, which was first experimentally observed in work that was published in 2024. Altermagnetic band structure breaks time-reversal symmetry, E_{ks}=E_{−ks} (E is energy, k wavevector and s spin) as in ferromagnets, however unlike in ferromagnets, it does not generate net magnetization. The altermagnetic spin polarisation alternates in wavevector space and forms characteristic 2, 4, or 6 spin-degenerate nodes, respectively, which correspond to d-, g-, or i-wave order parameters. A d-wave altermagnet can be regarded as the magnetic counterpart of a d-wave superconductor.

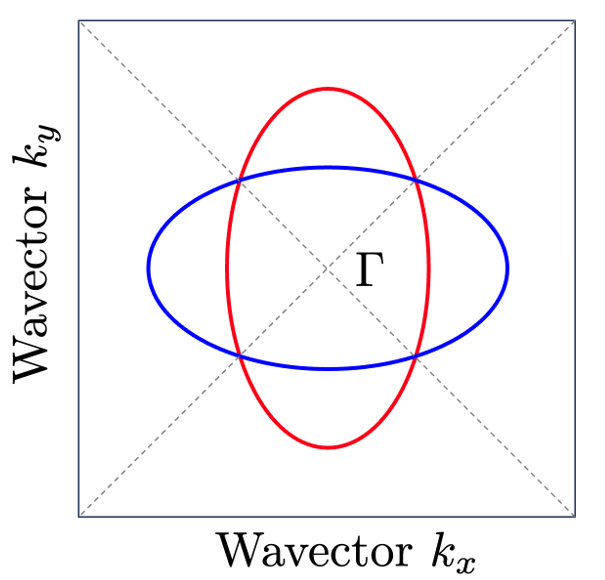
Fermi surface of an altermagnetic metal. The blue and red colors correspond to the up and down polarization of the spin.

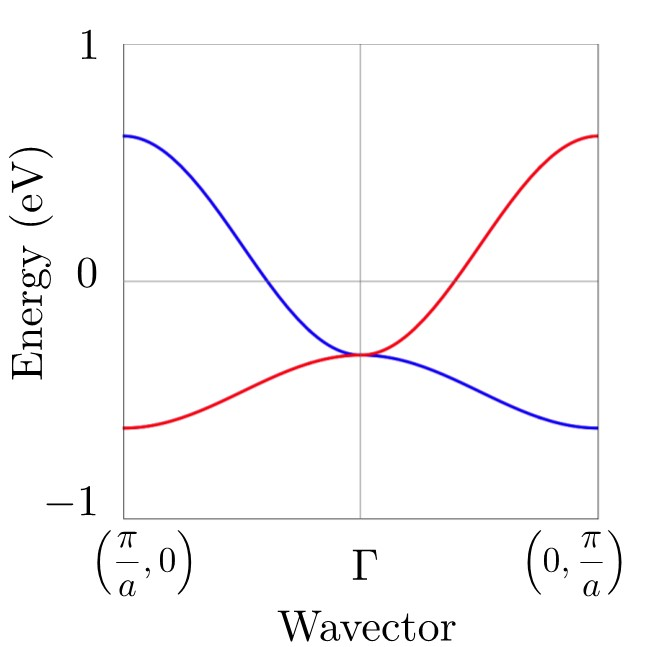
The band structure of an altermagnet.

The altermagnetic spin polarization in band structure (energy–wavevector diagram) is collinear and does not break inversion symmetry. The altermagnetic spin splitting is even in wavevector, i.e. (k_{x}^{2}−k_{y}^{2})s_{z}. It is thus also distinct from noncollinear Rashba or Dresselhaus spin texture which break inversion symmetry in noncentrosymmetric nonmagnetic or antiferromagnetic materials due to the spin-orbit coupling.

== Materials ==
Direct experimental evidence of altermagnetic band structure in semiconducting MnTe was first published in 2024. Many more materials are predicted to be altermagnets – ranging from insulators, semiconductors, and metals to superconductors. Altermagnetism was predicted in 3D and 2D materials with both light as well as heavy elements and can be found in nonrelativistic as well as relativistic band structures.

== Properties ==
Altermagnets exhibit an unusual combination of ferromagnetic and antiferromagnetic properties, which more closely resemble those of ferromagnets. Hallmarks of altermagnetic materials such as the anomalous Hall effect have been observed before (but this effect occurs also in other magnetically compensated systems such as non-collinear antiferromagnets). Altermagnets also exhibit unique properties such as unconventional piezomagnetism anomalous and noncollinear spin currents that can change sign as the crystal rotates.

== Experimental observations ==
In December 2024, researchers from the University of Nottingham provided the first experimental imaging of altermagnetism, confirming its unique spin-symmetry properties. Using Nitrogen-vacancy center microscopy and X-ray magnetic linear dichroism (XMLD), they visualized spin-polarized currents arising from the crystal-symmetry-protected altermagnetic order. This order featured antiparallel spin alignment within distinct crystal sublattices, creating a compensating spin polarization without macroscopic magnetization. These findings validated theoretical predictions and demonstrated the potential of altermagnetic materials in high-speed, low-energy spintronic devices.

== Connection of altermagnetism to antiferromagnetism and other states ==
It has been noted in that certain altermagnets can be find in a subset of systems with collinear antiferromagnetic exchange. Altermagnets can exhibit previously known phenomena of piezomagnetism and weak ferromagnets.

Collinear antiferromagnets are Néel-ordered magnets whose magnetic sublattices are related to each other by a combination of symmetries. There are PT-symmetric antiferromagnets, in which magnetic sublattices are connected by translation and/or inversion, and time-reversal operations. Such antiferromagnets are rare in Nature. In most antiferromagnets this symmetry is broken, and the magnetic sublattices are connected by a symmetry operation combining rotation, mirror reflection, or both, with time-reversal. The spin-splitting of quasiparticles, i.e. the altermagnetism, occurs in this class of antiferromagnets. Such antiferromagnets were experimentally discovered in 1958 by A.S. Borovik-Romanov group when observing weak ferromagnetism in collinear antiferromagnets. I.E. Dzyaloshinskii developed the symmetry-based thermodynamic theory of weak ferromagnetism in 1958, which was later microscopically expanded by T. Moriya via the Dzyaloshinskii-Moriya interaction. E.A. Turov classified all antiferromagnets for all symmetry classes using magnetic space groups. Importantly, it is understood that PT-symmetry must be broken in collinear antiferromagnets for weak ferromagnetism and piezomagnetism to occur. Weak ferromagnets might not necessarily have canting of the Néel order. It is rather broken PT-symmetry and other symmetries that define a weak ferromagnet and piezomagnet.

The spin-splitting effect in collinear antiferromagnets—were known for a long time, however the characteristic time-reversal breaking nature leading to diverse nomenclature such as d-wave, g-wave, i-wave, and mirror-symmetric spin-splitting was recognized only in recent studies. These types of spin-splitting correspond to how the magnetic sublattices connect to each other. However, such spin-splitting also appears in compensated ferrimagnets.

Various aspects of altermagnets was debated); it stems from applying spin group theory, rather than magnetic space group theory, to the in some cases already known systems previously understood as antiferromagnets. For example, despite being a traditional manifestation of piezomagnetism and weak ferromagnetism, a collinear antiferromagnet on a rutile lattice has recently been recognized to be a d-wave altermagnet. Or, hematite, the cornerstone of weak ferromagnetism, has recently been reclassified as a g-wave altermagnet. The field of altermagnetism has brought about the knowledge of time-reversal symmetry breaking spin-splitting of quasiparticles in systems with collinear antiferromagnetic exchange.
