= Lepra lichexanthonorstictica =

Scientific classification
- Domain: Eukaryota
- Kingdom: Fungi
- Division: Ascomycota
- Class: Lecanoromycetes
- Order: Pertusariales
- Family: Pertusariaceae
- Genus: Lepra
- Species: L. lichexanthonorstictica

Binomial name
- Lepra lichexanthonorstictica Aptroot (2021)

Species of lichen

Lepra lichexanthonorstictica is a species of crustose and corticolous (bark-dwelling) lichen in the family Pertusariaceae. Found in Brazil, it was formally described as a new species in 2021 by Dutch lichenologist André Aptroot. The type specimen was collected by Aptroot from the summit area of Quiriri (Garuva), at an altitude of 1,350 m (4,430 ft); here it was found growing on the bark of a pine tree. The lichen is named after its two major secondary compounds, lichexanthone and norstictic acid. Lepra lichexanthonorstictica has a thin, smooth and glossy thallus ranging in colour from white to very pale yellowish. The thallus has discrete, rounded soralia measuring about 0.5–0.9 mm in diameter.
