= Lepra schaereri =

Scientific classification
- Kingdom: Fungi
- Division: Ascomycota
- Class: Lecanoromycetes
- Order: Pertusariales
- Family: Pertusariaceae
- Genus: Lepra
- Species: L. schaereri

Binomial name
- Lepra schaereri (Hafellner) Hafellner (2016)

Synonyms
- Isidium spilomaticum Rabenh. (1845); Pertusaria coccodes var. isidioidea (Schaer.) J.Kickx f. (1867); Pertusaria communis f. isidioides (Schaer.) Hepp (1860); Pertusaria fallax f. isidioides (Schaer.) Kremp. (1861); Pertusaria fallax var. isidioides (Schaer.) Anzi (1862); Pertusaria schaereri Hafellner (2001); Spiloma isidioides Schaer. (1821)

Species of lichen

Lepra schaereri is a species of crustose lichen in the family Pertusariaceae. It occurs in Europe. It was first described by Swiss pastor and lichenologist Ludwig Schaerer in 1821 as Spiloma isidioides. Josef Hafellner renamed it as Pertusaria schaereri in 2001, and then transferred it to Lepra after that genus was reinstated in 2016 to contain members of the Pertusaria albescens species group.
