= Hauerite =

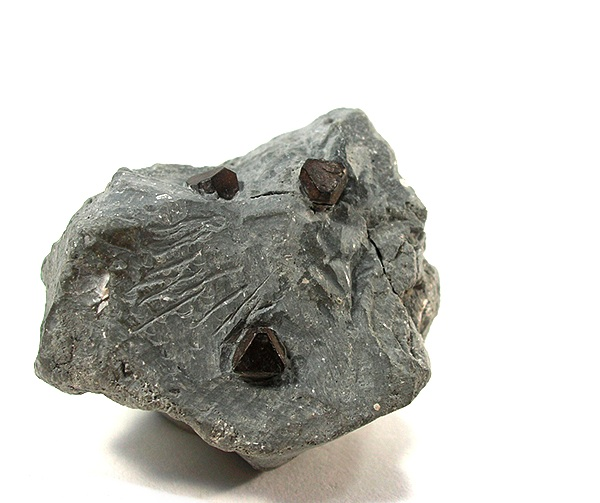

General
- Category: Sulfide mineral, pyrite group
- Formula: MnS_{2}
- IMA symbol: Hr
- Strunz classification: 2.EB.05a
- Crystal system: Cubic
- Crystal class: Diploidal (m3̅); H–M symbol: (2/m 3̅)
- Space group: Pa3̅
- Unit cell: a = 6.107 Å; Z = 4

Identification
- Formula mass: 119.07 g/mol
- Color: Reddish brown or brownish black
- Crystal habit: Octahedral crystals and globular aggregates
- Cleavage: {100} Perfect, {010} Perfect, Perfect on {001}
- Fracture: Uneven to subconchoidal
- Tenacity: Brittle
- Mohs scale hardness: 4
- Luster: Metallic-adamantine
- Streak: Reddish brown
- Diaphaneity: Opaque to subtranslucent
- Specific gravity: 3.463
- Optical properties: Isotropic
- Refractive index: n = 2.69

Hauerite is a sulfide mineral in the pyrite group. It is the mineral form of manganese disulfide MnS_{2}. It forms reddish brown or black octahedral crystals with the pyrite structure and it is usually found associated with the sulfides of other transition metals such as rambergite. It occurs in low temperature, sulfur rich environments associated with solfataras and salt deposits in association with native sulfur, realgar, gypsum and calcite.

It was discovered in Austro-Hungarian Monarchy in Kalinka (now Vígľašská Huta-Kalinka village) sulfur deposit near Detva in what is now Slovakia in 1846 and named after the Austrian geologists, Joseph Ritter von Hauer (1778–1863) and Franz Ritter von Hauer (1822–1899).

It is found in Texas, US; the Ural Mountains of Russia, and Sicily, Italy.

Under high pressure conditions (P>11 GPa), Hauerite undergoes a large collapse in unit cell volume (22%) driven by a spin-state transition.
