= Lepra austropacifica =

Scientific classification
- Kingdom: Fungi
- Division: Ascomycota
- Class: Lecanoromycetes
- Order: Pertusariales
- Family: Pertusariaceae
- Genus: Lepra
- Species: L. austropacifica

Binomial name
- Lepra austropacifica I.Schmitt & Lumbsch (2017)
- Holotype: Hienghène, New Caledonia

Species of lichen

Lepra austropacifica is a species of corticolous (bark-dwelling) crustose lichen in the family Pertusariaceae. Known from low-elevation forests in the South Pacific, it forms a thin, pale crust dotted with small, rounded patches of powdery reproductive granules (soredia). The species closely resembles Lepra scaberula in outward appearance and chemistry, but it is recognised as distinct based on DNA sequence data.

== Taxonomy ==
Lepra austropacifica was described as new to science by Imke Schmitt and Helge Thorsten Lumbsch in 2012. The holotype was collected on bark in mangrove forest near Hienghene, New Caledonia, at about 1 m (3 ft 3 in) elevation on 10 August 2012 (specimen K. Papong 8106 & H.T. Lumbsch; holotype IRD). Additional material was examined from the same area in New Caledonia and from Viti Levu, Fiji (secondary roadside forest, on a fallen trunk). The specific epithet refers to its South Pacific occurrence.

== Description ==
The thallus is corticolous (bark-dwelling), thin, and crustose (forming a firmly attached crust). Its surface is pale whitish to grey-white and uneven, ranging from distinctly warted (verrucose) to finely warted (verruculose). The margin merges into the substrate without a clear border, and no contrasting prothallus (bare fringe) is visible. The thallus is sorediate and lacks isidia. Rounded soralia (the small patches where soredia are produced) are hemispherical and remain discrete, typically 0.5–1.5 mm in diameter; the soredia themselves are granular and yellowish white to grey-white. Sexual structures (apothecia) and asexual spore-bearing pycnidia were not observed, so the species is known only in a sterile state. The lichen contains the secondary metabolites (lichen products) lichexanthone and thamnolic acid.

=== Similar species ===
Lepra austropacifica is phenotypically very similar to L. scaberula and shares the same secondary chemistry. According to the describing authors, molecular data is required for reliable separation from L. scaberula, especially for sterile, sorediate material.

== Habitat and distribution ==
This species is, so far, known only from the South Pacific. It has been recorded on bark in mangrove forest and in secondary lowland forest. Collections are documented from northern New Caledonia (Hienghene area) and from Viti Levu, Fiji.
