= Lepra erythrella =

Scientific classification
- Kingdom: Fungi
- Division: Ascomycota
- Class: Lecanoromycetes
- Order: Pertusariales
- Family: Pertusariaceae
- Genus: Lepra
- Species: L. erythrella

Binomial name
- Lepra erythrella (Müll.Arg.) I.Schmitt, B.P.Hodk. & Lumbsch

Synonyms
- Synonymy: Marfloraea erythrella (Müll. Arg.) S.Y. Kondr., L. Lökös & Hur, in Kondratyuk et al.; Pertusaria erythrella Müll.Arg.; Pertusaria (s. Lecanorastrum) erythrella Müll.Arg.; Pertusaria torulosa Vain.

Species of lichen

Lepra erythrella is a species of Corticolous lichen in the family Pertusariaceae. Found in Australia, New Zealand and the Galapagos Islands, it was formally described as Pertusaria erythrella in 1893 by Johannes Müller Argoviensis.

== Taxonomy ==
The species was first described as Pertusaria (s. Lecanorastrum) erythrella by Johannes Müller Argoviensis in 1893. In 2017 the genus Pertusaria was revised based on phylogenetic analysis, and the taxon was placed in the genus Lepra by Brendan Paul Hodkinson, Imke Schmitt and Helge Thorsten Lumbsch.

== Description ==
The species has a thallus coloured white/green when wet, which changes to off-white and grey when dry.

== Distribution and habitat ==
Lepra erythrella is found in eastern and southern Australia, including the Bass Strait Islands and Tasmania, New Zealand, and the Galapagos Islands.
