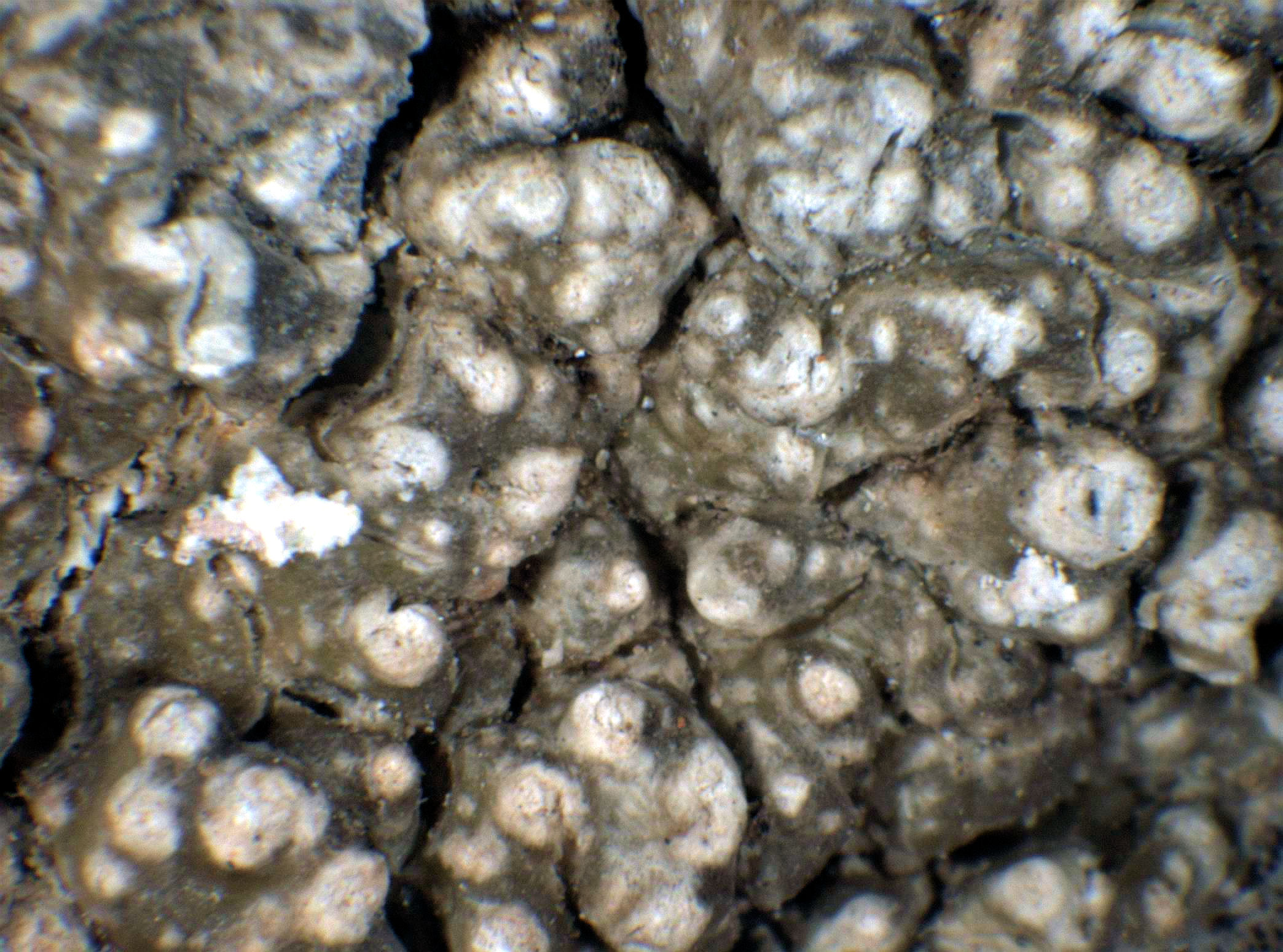
- Closeup of specimen found in São Paulo, Brazil

Scientific classification
- Kingdom: Fungi
- Division: Ascomycota
- Class: Lecanoromycetes
- Order: Pertusariales
- Family: Pertusariaceae
- Genus: Lepra
- Species: L. melanochlora

Binomial name
- Lepra melanochlora (DC.) Hafellner (2016)

Synonyms
- List: Isidium melanochlorum DC. (1805); Lichen melanochlorus (DC.) Lam. (1813); Pertusaria rupestris var. melanochlora (DC.) Schaer. (1850); Pertusaria melanochlora (DC.) Nyl. (1873); Pertusaria dactylina var. melanochlora (DC.) H.Olivier (1890)

= Lepra melanochlora =

Species of lichen-forming fungus

Lepra melanochlora is a species of saxicolous (rock-dwelling) crustose lichen in the family Pertusariaceae.

== Description ==
The thallus of Lepra melanochlora is rather thick, grey to dark grey, and usually cracked into small areoles. Its surface is crowded with coarse, cylindrical, isidia-like papillae that are typically 2–3 mm tall and 0.5–2 mm wide. These outgrowths are only rarely branched, and their tips are blunt, somewhat flattened, and paler than the rest. The papillae are often worn at the apex, exposing the white medulla, which may sometimes produce a small amount of granular soredia.

Fruiting structures are uncommon. When present, fertile warts arise from the papillae and later expand to about 2–3.5 mm across. Each usually bears a few apothecia (often poorly developed), with one to five apothecia per papilla. The disc is black, 1.5–2 mm wide, often dusted with a whitish pruina, and may be flat to convex and somewhat irregular; it is bordered by a curved, wrinkled thalline margin. The asci are 1-spored, and the ascospores are very large, typically measuring about 180–250 × 70–130 micrometres (μm) but occasionally reaching up to 300 × 200 μm, with a smooth, unzoned wall about 22 μm thick. Conidia are cylindrical, about 4–5 × 0.5–1 μm. In a compilation of lichenized and non-lichenized Ascomycota with the largest reported ascospores, those of Pertusaria melanochlora had the largest volume: 300 × 200 μm, equivalent to 0.05 cubic millimetres.

In standard spot tests, the thallus is C− and UV−, K+ (yellow turning red), KC+ (magenta-violet, briefly), and Pd+ (orange-red); it contains picrolichenic and protocetraric acids.
