= Manganese disulfide =

Names
- Other names Manganese sulfide Manganese disulfide Hauerite

Identifiers
CAS Number	12125-23-4
3D model (JSmol)	Interactive image
- InChI: InChI=1S/Mn.2S/q+4;2*-2 Key: HUOSXUVFHUFNTL-UHFFFAOYSA-N
- SMILES: [Mn+2].[S-][S-]

Properties
Chemical formula	MnS_{2}
Molar mass	119.07 g/mol

Structure
Space group	Pa3̅
Lattice constant	a = 6.107 Å

Related compounds
Related manganese sulfides	Manganese(II) sulfide
- Except where otherwise noted, data are given for materials in their standard state (at 25 °C [77 °F], 100 kPa). Infobox references

Manganese disulfide is a sulfide compound of manganese with the chemical formula MnS_{2}. It is structurely a disulfide Mn^{2+}S^{2-}_{2}. It occurs naturally as the mineral hauerite.
