= Manganese oxalate =

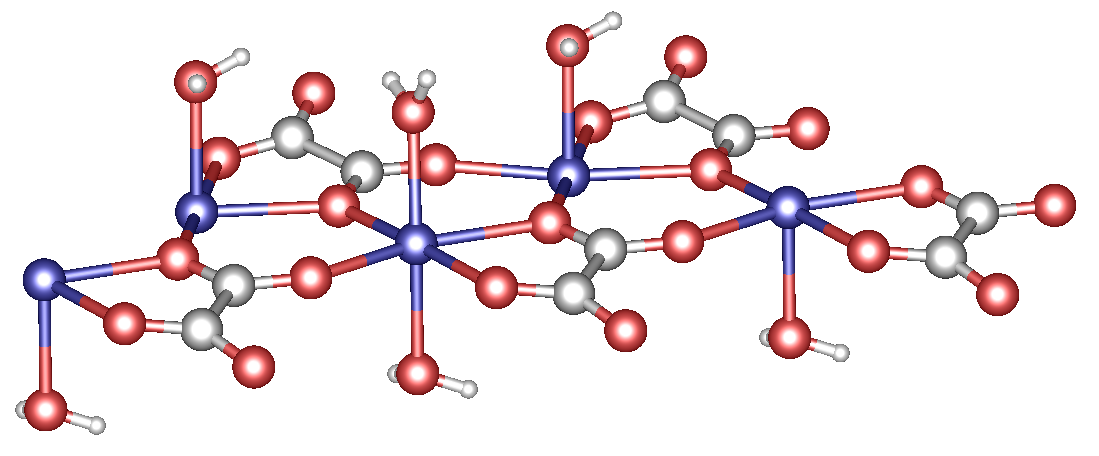
- Portion of manganese(II) oxalate dihydrate crystal (red = O, blue = Mn, white = H)

Names
- Other names Manganese(II) oxalate, Manganese(2+) oxalate, Lindbergite

Identifiers
CAS Number	640-67-5
3D model (JSmol)	Interactive image
ChemSpider	62705
ECHA InfoCard	100.010.335
EC Number	211-367-3
PubChem CID	69499
UNII	A8PK5I86G8
CompTox Dashboard (EPA)	DTXSID90894218
- InChI: InChI=1S/C2H2O4.Mn/c3-1(4)2(5)6;/h(H,3,4)(H,5,6);/q;+2/p-2 Key: RGVLTEMOWXGQOS-UHFFFAOYSA-L
- SMILES: C(=O)(C(=O)[O-])[O-].[Mn+2]

Properties
Chemical formula	C_{2}MnO_{4}
Molar mass	142.956 g·mol^{−1}
Appearance	Light pink crystals
Density	2.43
Solubility in water	insoluble
Solubility product (K_{sp})	1.7×10^{−7}

Hazards
- GHS labelling
Pictograms	(GHS07: Exclamation mark)
Signal word	Warning
Hazard statements	H302, H312
Precautionary statements	P264, P270, P280, P301+P312, P302+P352, P312, P322, P330, P363, P501

Related compounds
Related compounds	Magnesium oxalate Strontium oxalate Barium oxalate Iron(II) oxalate Iron(III) oxalate Praseodymium oxalate
- Except where otherwise noted, data are given for materials in their standard state (at 25 °C [77 °F], 100 kPa). Infobox references

Manganese oxalate is an inorganic compound with the chemical formula MnC_{2}O_{4}. Solid samples are pale pink and insoluble in water. At least two hydrates have been observed. It occurs naturally as the mineral Lindbergite.

== Synthesis ==
Exchange reaction between sodium oxalate and manganese chloride:

MnCl_{2} + Na_{2}C_{2}O_{4} + 2 H_{2}O → MnC_{2}O_{4}·2H_{2}O + 2 NaCl

The dihydrate can also be prepared hydrothermally.

== Physical properties ==
Manganese oxalate forms light pink crystals. The crystalline hydrates have the composition MnC_{2}O_{4}•n H_{2}O, where n = 2 and 3. The dihydrate forms light pink crystals of the orthorhombic system, space group P2_{1}2_{1}2_{1}, cell parameters a = 0.6262 nm, b = 1.3585 nm, c = 0.6091 nm, Z = 4, melts in its own crystallization water at 100 °C.

It does not dissolve in water, pK_{sp} = 6.8.

== Chemical properties ==
Manganese oxalate is a precursor various manganese oxides, such as MnO, Mn_{2}O_{3}, and Mn_{3}O_{4}. it decomposes at 215 °C:

MnC_{2}O_{4} → MnO + CO_{2} + CO

== See also ==
- Iron oxalate
