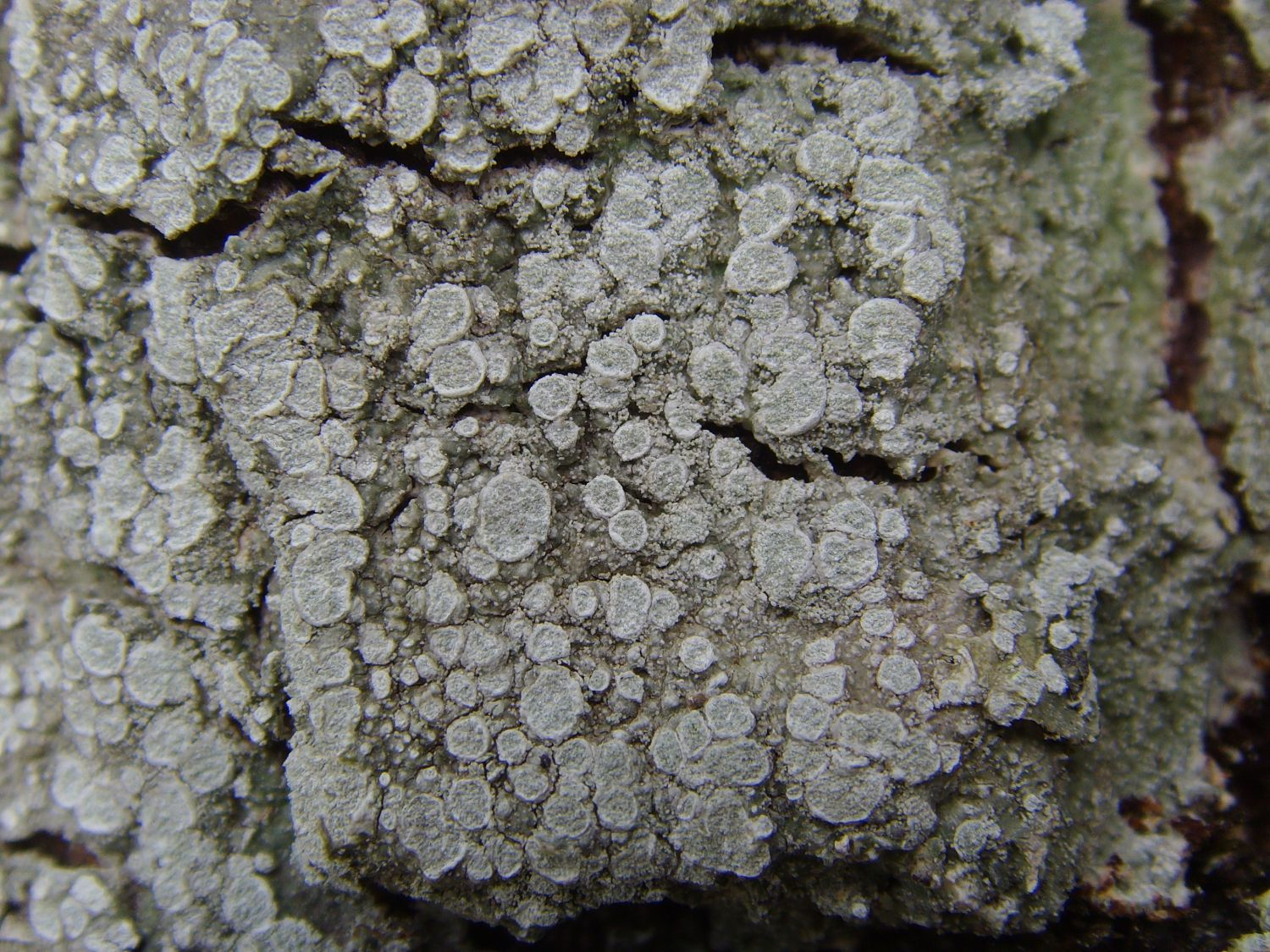
- Lepra albescens

Scientific classification
- Kingdom: Fungi
- Division: Ascomycota
- Class: Lecanoromycetes
- Order: Pertusariales
- Family: Pertusariaceae
- Genus: Lepra; Scop. (1777)

Type species
- Lepra albescens (Huds.) Hafellner (2016)

Synonyms
- List: Variolaria Pers. (1791); Leproncus Ventenat (1799); Isidium (Ach.) Ach. (1803); Pertusaria sect. Lecanorastrum Müll.Arg. (1884); Pertusaria subg. Monomurata Archer (1993); Pertusaria sect. Digitatae Archer (1993); Marfloraea S.Y.Kondr., L.Lökös & Hur (2015)

= Lepra (lichen) =

Genus of lichens

Lepra is a genus of lichen-forming fungi in the family Pertusariaceae. Although the genus was created in 1777, it was not regularly used until it was resurrected in 2016 following molecular phylogenetic analyses. It has more than a hundred species, most of which were previously classified in genus Pertusaria.

== Taxonomy ==
The genus was originally circumscribed by the Austrian naturalist Giovanni Antonio Scopoli in 1777. Martyn Dibben designated Lichen albescens (=Lepra albescens) as a neotype for the genus in 1980. In 2015, Kondratyuk and colleagues proposed the new genus Marfloraea to contain 13 members of the Variola group (one of four major clades identified in Pertusaria in the broad sense), with Marfloraea amara (=Lepra amara) selected as the type. The proposed genus was rejected a year later when Josef Hafellner and Ayşen Türk explained that the new genus name was superfluous because older available names existed that should have instead been used. Consequently, the genus Lepra was reinstated to contain species formerly placed in the Pertusaria albescens species group.

Subsequent molecular studies have confirmed that the species now placed in Lepra form a well-supported, monophyletic lineage that is distinct from Pertusaria in the strict sense. For much of the twentieth century these lichens were often treated under Variolaria Pers. (1794), but that name is a later homonym of Variolaria Bull. (1791), which applies to a different taxon of uncertain disposition. A proposal was therefore put forward to conserve Variolaria Pers. against both Lepra and Variolaria Bull., so that the traditional name Variolaria could continue to be used for this group. However, by the time the proposal was considered, Lepra had already been widely adopted in the recent literature, almost all required new combinations had been made, and several additional species had been described in the genus. The Nomenclature Committee for Fungi judged that reverting to Variolaria would be more disruptive than maintaining current usage of Lepra, and voted against recommending conservation.

== Description ==
Genus Lepra contains crustose lichens with the following features: disc-like ascomata; a hymenial gel that is weakly amyloid to non-amyloid; asci that are strongly amyloid but lack clear amyloid structures at their tips; and asci containing one or two single-layered, thin-walled ascospores.

== Species ==
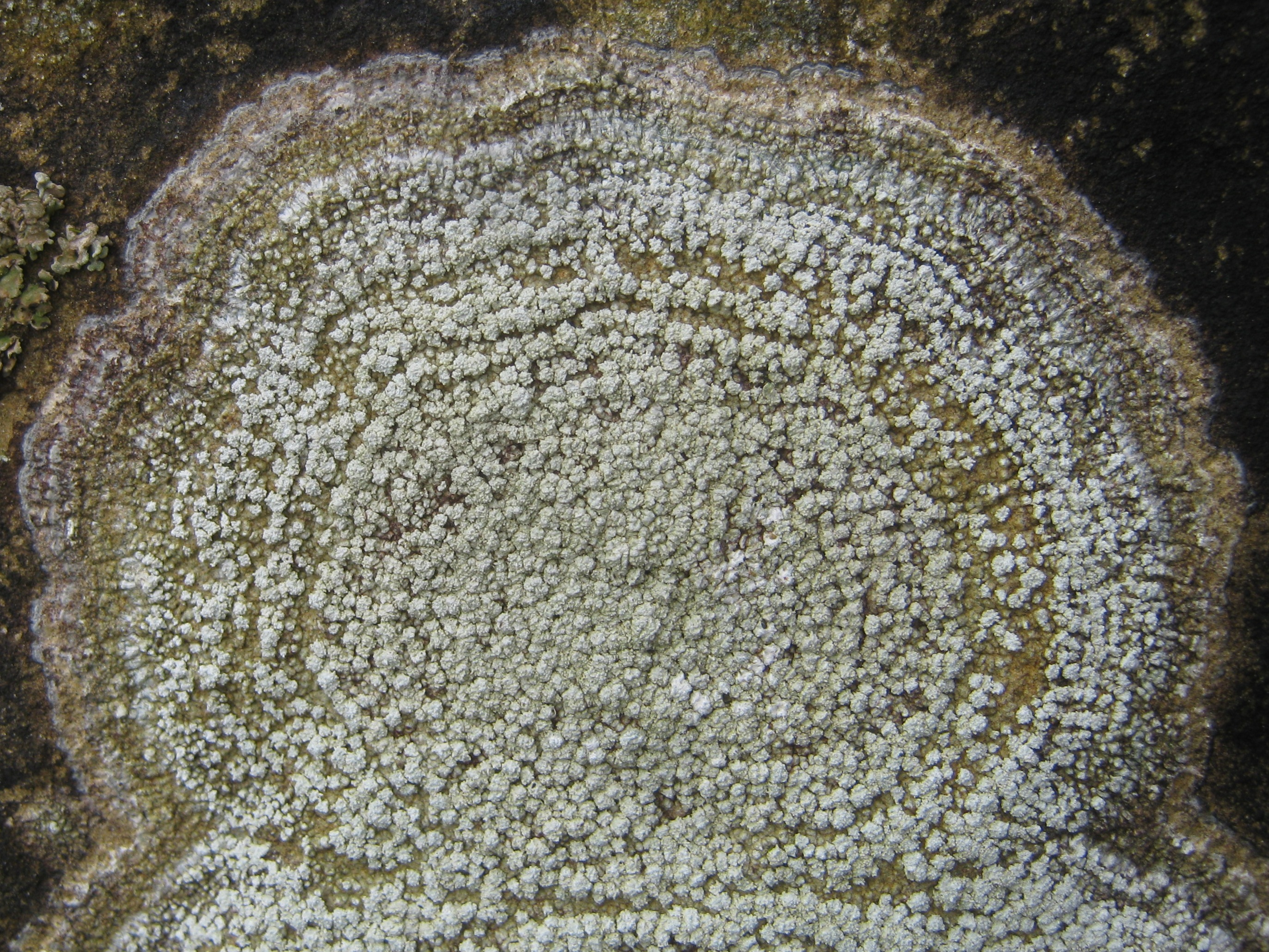
Lepra amara

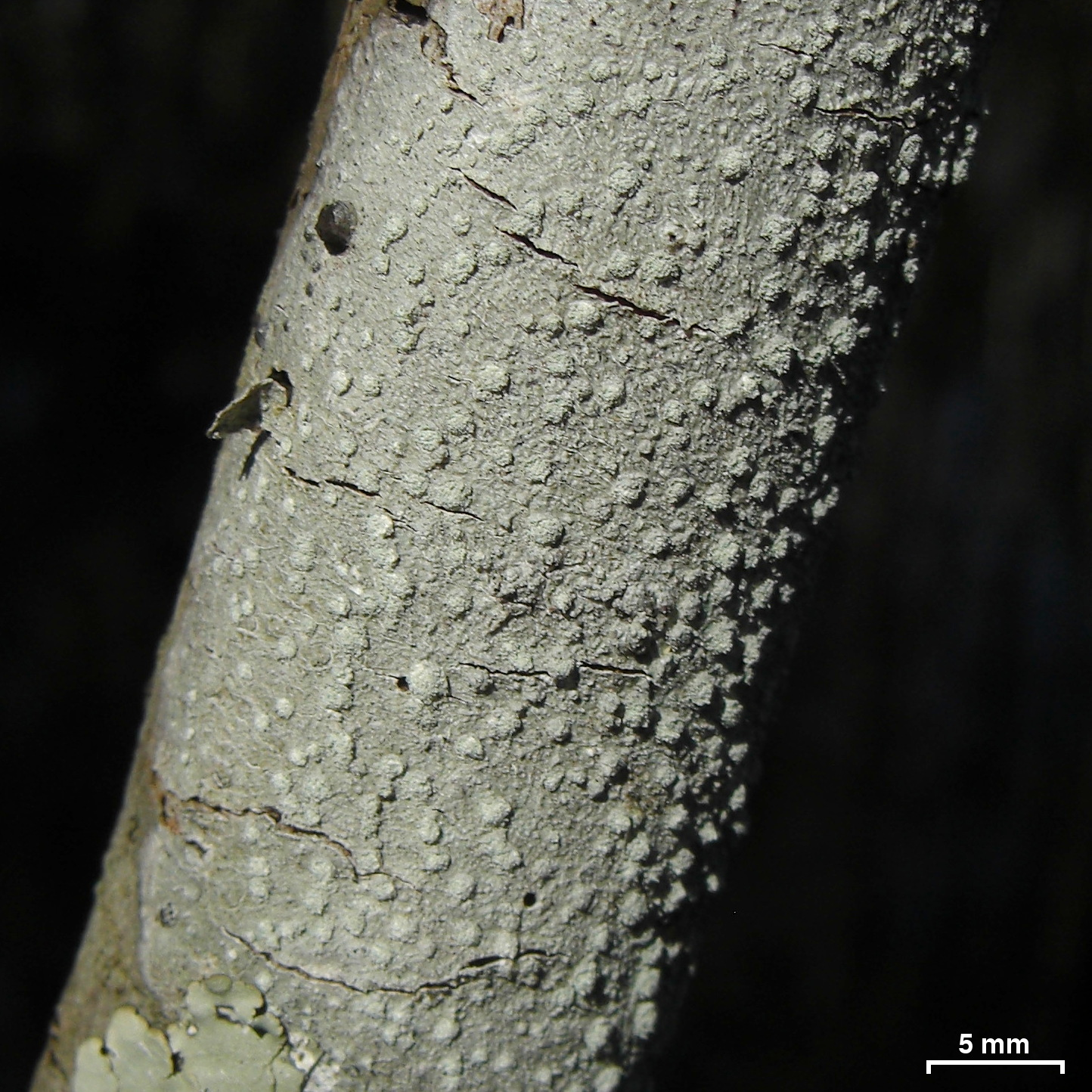
Lepra commutata

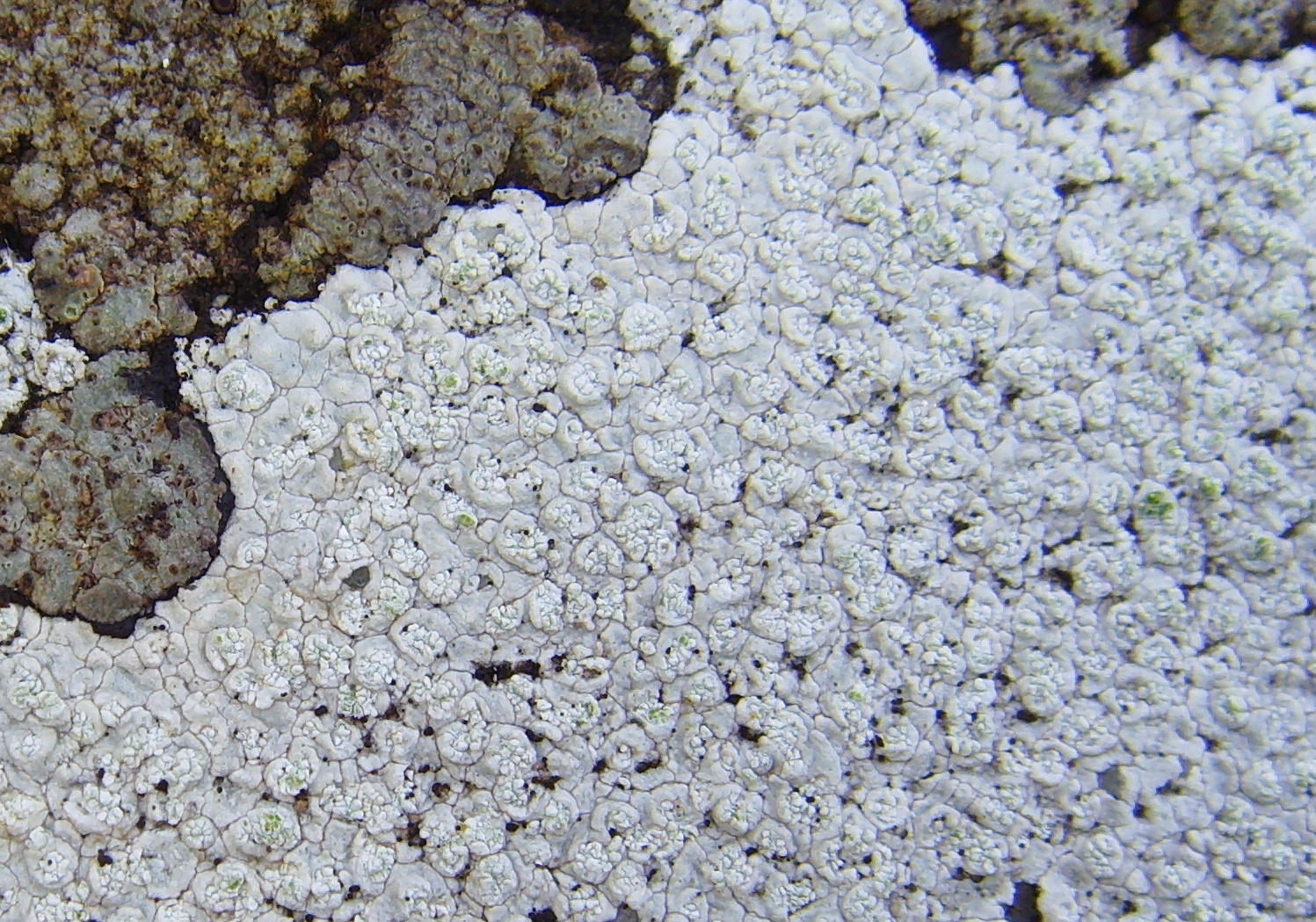
Lepra excludens

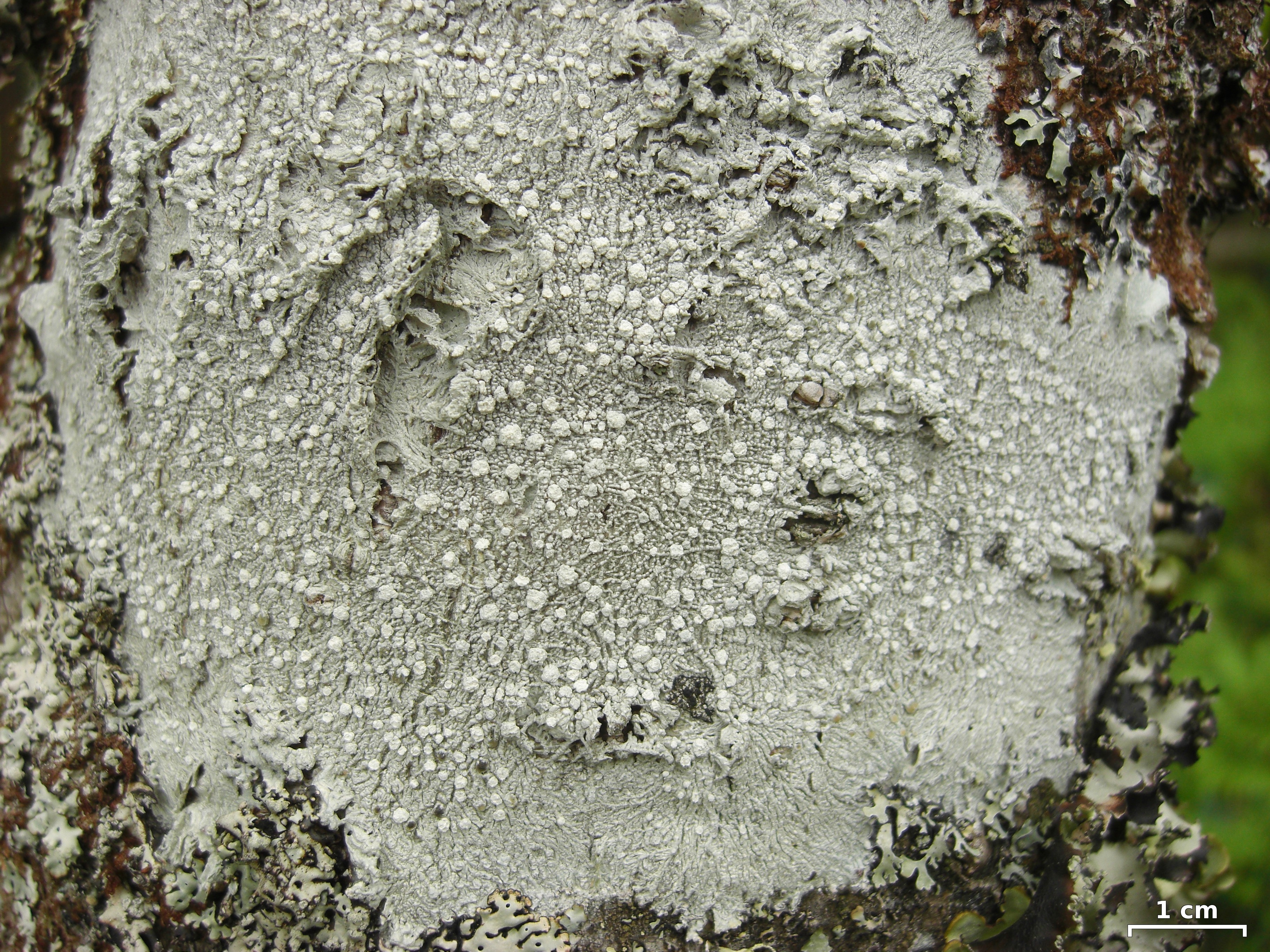
Lepra trachythallina

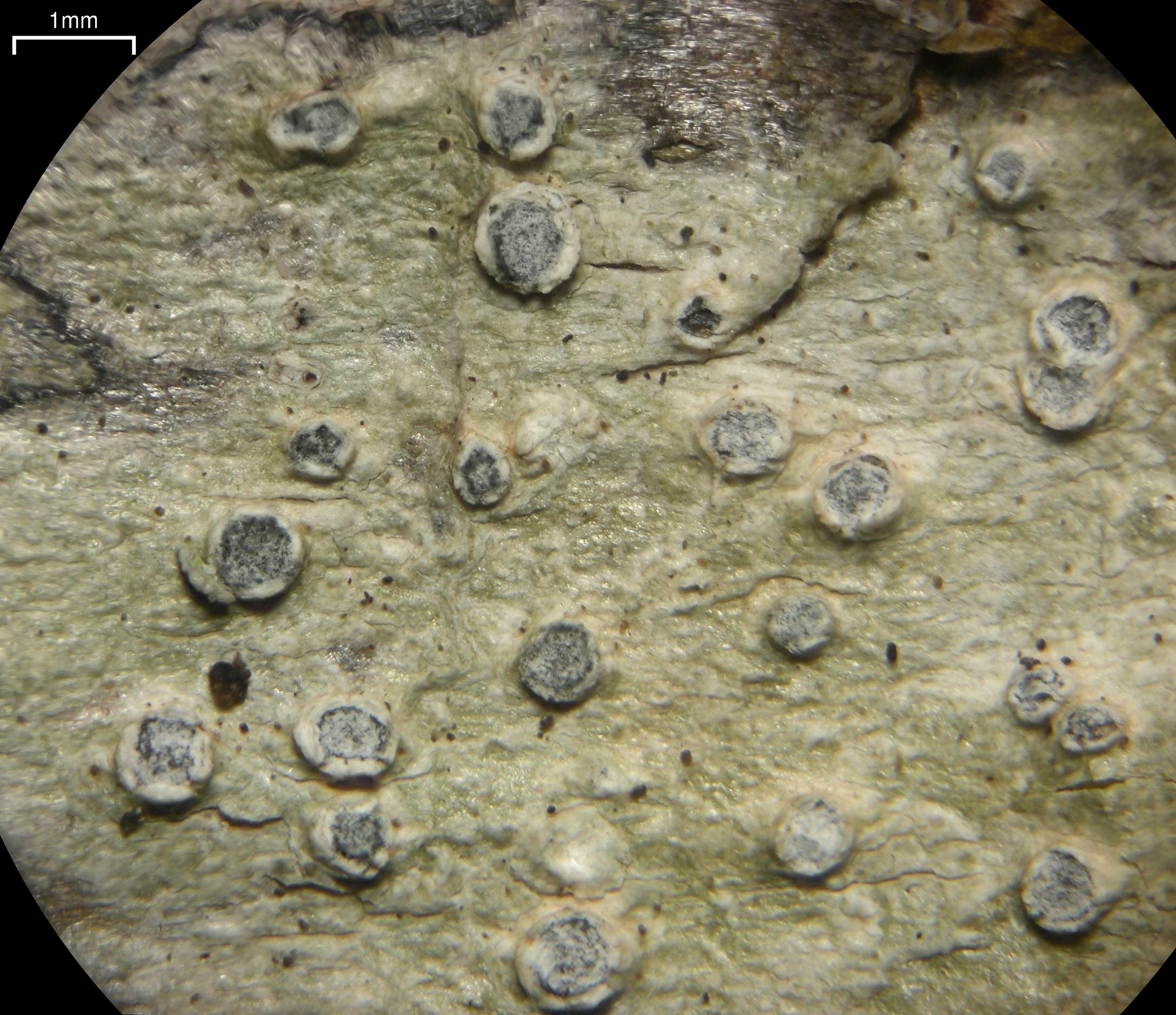
Lepra waghornei

As of September 2025, Species Fungorum (in the Catalogue of Life) accepts 104 species of Lepra:

- Lepra acroscyphoides (Sipman) I.Schmitt, B.P.Hodk. & Lumbsch (2017)
- Lepra albescens (Huds.) Hafellner (2016)
- Lepra albopunctata (A.W.Archer & Elix) A.W.Archer & Elix (2018)
- Lepra alterimosa (Darb.) I.Schmitt, B.P.Hodk. & Lumbsch (2017)
- Lepra alticola (Q.Ren) Q.Ren (2019)
- Lepra amara (Ach.) Hafellner (2016)
- Lepra amaroides (H.Magn.) I.Schmitt, B.P.Hodk. & Lumbsch (2017)
- Lepra andersoniae (Lendemer) Lendemer & R.C.Harris (2017)
- Lepra argentea Fryday (2019) – Falkland Islands
- Lepra arida A.W.Archer & Elix (2020) – Australia
- Lepra asiana (Vain.) A.W.Archer & Elix (2018)
- Lepra aspergilla (Ach.) Hafellner (2016)
- Lepra austropacifica I.Schmitt & Lumbsch (2017)
- Lepra bambusetorum (Zahlbr.) Q.Ren (2019)
- Lepra buloloensis (A.W.Archer, Elix & Streimann) I.Schmitt & Lumbsch (2017)
- Lepra caucasica (Erichsen) Hafellner (2016)
- Lepra clarkeana (A.W.Archer) I.Schmitt, B.P.Hodk. & Lumbsch (2017)
- Lepra colorata (D.D.Awasthi & Preeti Srivast.) Q.Ren (2019)
- Lepra commutata (Müll.Arg.) Lendemer & R.C.Harris (2017)
- Lepra composita (Zahlbr.) Q.Ren (2019)
- Lepra corallina (L.) Hafellner (2016)
- Lepra corallophora (Vain.) Hafellner (2016)
- Lepra dactylina (Ach.) Hafellner (2016)
- Lepra dactylinella (Kantvilas & Elix) A.W.Archer & Elix (2018)
- Lepra elatinica A.W.Archer & Elix (2020) – Australia
- Lepra erubescens (Hook.f. & Taylor) A.W.Archer & Elix (2018)
- Lepra erythrella (Müll.Arg.) I.Schmitt, B.G.Hodk. & Lumbsch (2017)
- Lepra excludens (Nyl.) Hafellner (2016)
- Lepra flavovelata (Elix & Malcolm) I.Schmitt, B.G.Hodk. & Lumbsch (2017)
- Lepra floridana (Dibben) Lendemer & R.C.Harris (2017)
- Lepra gedehana (Zahlbr.) Sipman (2022)
- Lepra graeca (Erichsen) Hafellner (2016)
- Lepra hengduanensis (Q.Ren) Q.Ren (2019)
- Lepra huangshanensis (Sen H.Yu & J.N.Wu ex Q.Ren) Q.Ren (2019)
- Lepra hypothamnolica (Dibben) Lendemer & R.C.Harris (2017)
- Lepra isidioides Delastre (1830)
- Lepra lacericans (A.W.Archer) A.W.Archer & Elix (2018)
- Lepra laceromarginata (Q.Ren) Q.Ren (2019)
- Lepra leeuwenii (Zahlbr.) A.W.Archer & Elix (2020) – Australia
- Lepra leonina (Stizenb.) I.Schmitt, B.G. Hodk. & Lumbsch (2017)
- Lepra leucopsara (Kremp.) Q.Ren (2019)
- Lepra leucosora (Nyl.) Hafellner (2016)
- Lepra leucosorodes (Nyl.) I.Schmitt, B.G.Hodk. & Lumbsch (2017)
- Lepra lichexanthonorstictica Aptroot (2021) – Brazil
- Lepra lijiangensis (Q.Ren) Q.Ren (2019)
- Lepra macloviana (Müll.Arg.) I.Schmitt, B.G.Hodk. & Lumbsch (2017)
- Lepra mammosa (Harm.) Hafellner (2016)
- Lepra melanochlora (DC.) Hafellner (2016)
- Lepra miniatescens (A.W.Archer & Elix) A.W.Archer & Elix (2018)
- Lepra monogona (Nyl.) Hafellner (2016)
- Lepra multipuncta (Turner) Hafellner (2016)
- Lepra multipunctoides (Dibben) Lendemer & R.C.Harris (2017)
- Lepra muricata (J.C.David) A.W.Archer & Elix (2018)
- Lepra neotriconica (Elix & A.W.Archer) A.W.Archer & Elix (2018)
- Lepra novae-zelandiae (Szatala) I.Schmitt, A.W.Archer & Lumbsch (2017)
- Lepra ocellata (Körb.) Hafellner (2016)
- Lepra ophthalmiza (Nyl.) Hafellner (2016)
- Lepra ornatula (Müll.Arg.) I.Schmitt, B.P.Hodk. & Lumbsch (2017)
- Lepra panyrga (Ach.) Hafellner (2016)
- Lepra parathalassica (Kantvilas & Elix) A.W.Archer & Elix (2018)
- Lepra perlacericans A.W.Archer & Elix (2020) – Australia
- Lepra pseudodactylina (A.W.Archer) A.W.Archer & Elix (2018)
- Lepra pseudolactea (Erichsen) Hafellner (2016)
- Lepra pseudosubventosa Kukwa & B.Guzow-Krzem. (2019) – Bolivia
- Lepra psoromica (A.W.Archer & Elix) A.W.Archer & Elix (2018)
- Lepra pulvinata (Erichsen) Hafellner (2016)
- Lepra pustulata (Brodo & W.L.Culb.) Lendemer & R.C.Harris (2017)
- Lepra roseola (A.W.Archer & Elix) A.W.Archer & Elix (2018)
- Lepra rugifera (Müll.Arg.) I.Schmitt, B.P.Hodk. & Lumbsch (2017)
- Lepra scaberula (A.W.Archer) I.Schmitt, B.P.Hodk. & Lumbsch (2017)
- Lepra schaereri (Hafellner) Hafellner (2016)
- Lepra scutellifera (A.W.Archer & Elix) I.Schmitt, B.P.Hodk. & Lumbsch (2017)
- Lepra setschwanica (Zahlbr.) Q.Ren (2019)
- Lepra slesvicensis (Erichsen) Hafellner (2016)
- Lepra sordida (A.W.Archer) A.W.Archer & Elix (2018)
- Lepra sphaerophora (Oshio) I.Schmitt, B.P.Hodk. & Lumbsch (2017)
- Lepra stalactiza (Nyl.) Hafellner (2016)
- Lepra subcomposita (Oshio) I.Schmitt, Hodk. & Lumbsch (2017)
- Lepra subdactylina (Nyl.) Lendemer & R.C. Harris (2017)
- Lepra sublacerans (A.W.Archer) A.W.Archer & Elix (2018)
- Lepra submultipuncta (Nyl.) Q.Ren (2019)
- Lepra subventosa (Malme) I.Schmitt & Lumbsch (2017)
- Lepra subvelata (G.Merr.) T.Sprib. (2020)
- Lepra superans (Müll.Arg.) I.Schmitt, B.P.Hodk. & Lumbsch (2017)
- Lepra taiwanensis Q.Ren (2022)
- Lepra teneriffensis (Vain.) Hafellner (2016)
- Lepra thamnolica (A.W.Archer) A.W.Archer & Elix (2018)
- Lepra tibetensis (Z.S.Sun) Q.Ren (2019)
- Lepra trachythallina (Erichsen) Lendemer & R.C.Harris (2017)
- Lepra trichosa (Elix & A.W.Archer) A.W.Archer & Elix (2018)
- Lepra tropica (Vain.) Lendemer & R.C.Harris (2017)
- Lepra truncata (Kremp.) A.W.Archer & Elix (2018)
- Lepra tuberculata (Erichsen) Hafellner (2016)
- Lepra umbricola (A.W.Archer & Elix) A.W.Archer & Elix (2018)
- Lepra variolina (Nyl.) Q.Ren (2019)
- Lepra variolosa I.Schmitt, A.W.Archer & Lumbsch (2017)
- Lepra ventosa (Malme) Lendemer & R.C.Harris (2017)
- Lepra violacea (Oshio) I.Schmitt, B.P.Hodk. & Lumbsch (2017)
- Lepra waghornei (Hulting) Lendemer & R.C.Harris (2017)
- Lepra wallamanensis (Elix & A.W.Archer) A.W.Archer & Elix (2018)
- Lepra wangii (Q.Ren) Q.Ren (2019)
- Lepra wawreana (A.Massal.) I.Schmitt, B.P.Hodk. & Lumbsch (2017)
- Lepra weii (Q.Ren) Q.Ren (2019)
- Lepra wulingensis (Z.T.Zhao & Z.S.Sun) Q.Ren (2019)
- Lepra xantholeuca (Müll.Arg.) I.Schmitt, A.W.Archer & Lumbsch (2017)
- Lepra yunlingensis Q.Ren (2022)
