= Alabandite =

Sulfide mineral

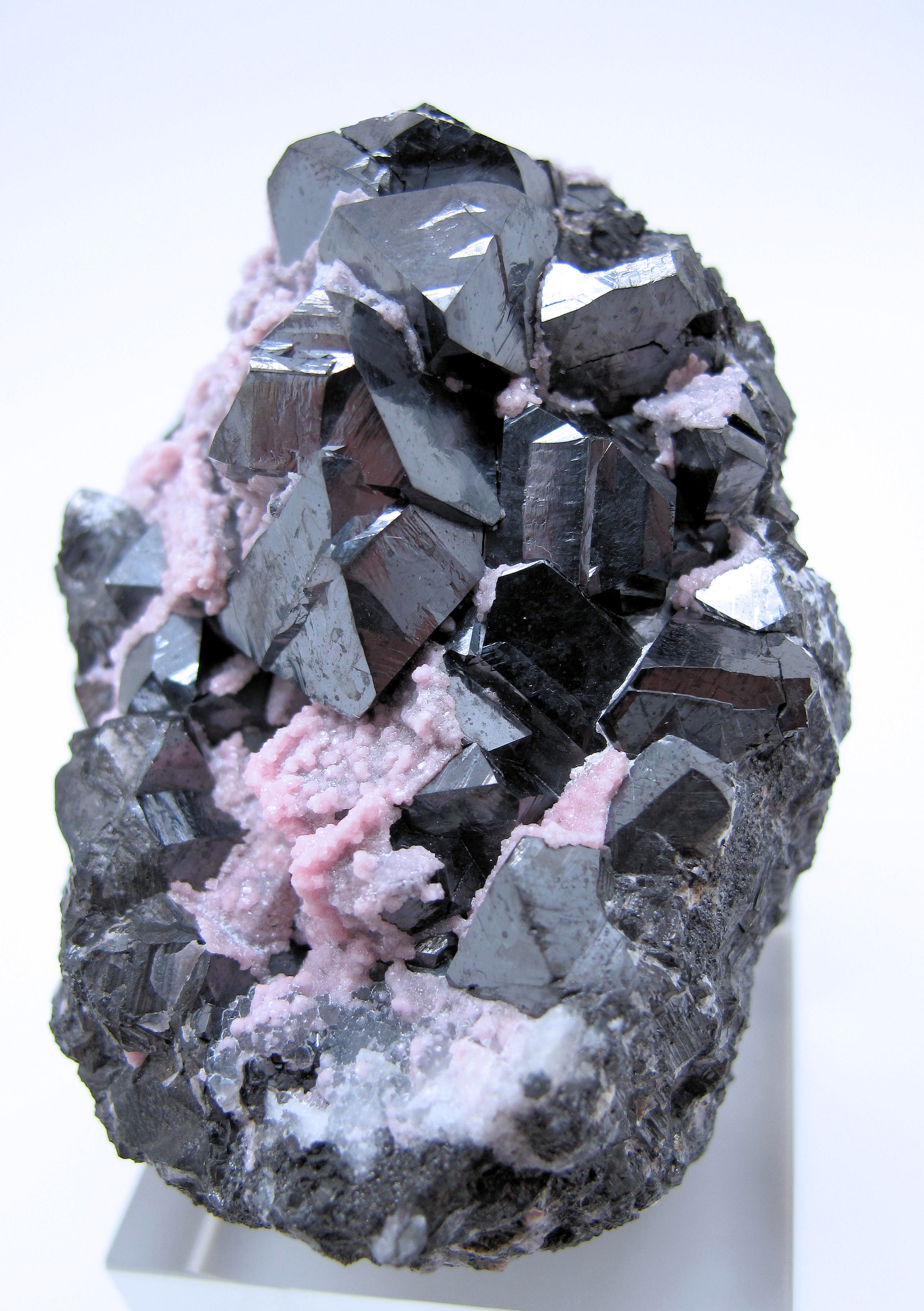
- Group of octahedral alabandite crystals partially coated with pink rhodochrosite, from Uchucchacua Mine, Oyon, Lima, Peru (size: 60 mm × 59 mm × 46 mm, 204 g)

General
- Category: Sulfide mineral
- Formula: MnS
- IMA symbol: Abd
- Strunz classification: 2.CD.10 (10 ed); II/C.15-30 (8 ed)
- Dana classification: 2.8.1.4
- Crystal system: Cubic
- Crystal class: Hexoctahedral (m3̅m); H-M symbol: (4/m 3̅ 2/m)
- Space group: Fm3̅m
- Unit cell: a = 5.2236 Å; Z = 4

Identification
- Color: black, steel-gray, brownish-black
- Crystal habit: mostly massive or granular; cubic or octahedral crystals to 1 cm
- Twinning: Lamellar || {111}
- Cleavage: Perfect on {100}
- Fracture: Irregular, uneven
- Tenacity: Brittle
- Mohs scale hardness: 3.5 to 4
- Luster: Sub-metallic
- Streak: Green
- Diaphaneity: Opaque, translucent in thin fragments
- Specific gravity: 4.053
- Optical properties: Isotropic
- Refractive index: n = 2.70

Alabandite or alabandine, formerly known as manganese blende or bluemenbachite is a rarely occurring manganese sulfide mineral. It crystallizes in the cubic crystal system with the chemical composition Mn^{2+}S and develops commonly massive to granular aggregates, but rarely also cubic or octahedral crystals to 1 cm.

== Etymology and history ==
Alabandite was first described in 1784 by Franz-Joseph Müller von Reichenstein. The mineral name is derived from its supposed discovery locality at Alabanda (Aïdin) in Turkey.

== Occurrence ==
Alabandite forms in epithermal polymetallic sulfide veins and low-temperature manganese deposits. It occurs with acanthite, calcite, chalcopyrite, galena, pyrite, quartz, rhodochrosite, rhodonite, sphalerite and native tellurium. Sometimes it was found in meteorites.

Localities are several areas in Antarctica, Argentina, Armenia, Australia, Bolivia, Brazil, Bulgaria, Canada, China, Czech Republic, Finland, France, Germany, Ghana, Greece, Greenland, India, Italy, Japan, Kyrgyzstan, Mexico, New Zealand, Norway, Peru, Poland, Romania, Russia, Slovakia, South Africa, South Korea, Sweden, Switzerland, Taiwan, Tanzania, the United Kingdom, the US, Uzbekistan and Yemen. All together at present time approximately 220 discovery sites are registered.

== Crystal structure ==
Alabandite crystallizes in the cubic crystal system in the space group Fm3m with the lattice parameter a = 5.22 Å and four formula units per unit cell.

== See also ==
- List of minerals
