= Rambergite =

General
- Category: Sulfide mineral
- Formula: MnS
- Strunz classification: 2.CB.45
- Crystal system: Hexagonal

Identification
- Color: Dark brown to black
- Fracture: Uneven – irregular
- Mohs scale hardness: 4
- Luster: Resinous
- Streak: brown
- Optical properties: Uniaxial (+)

Rambergite is a manganese sulfide mineral with formula MnS.

It has been found in anoxic marine sediments, rich in organic matter of the Gotland Deep, Baltic Sea and also in skarn in the Garpenberg area, Dalarna, Sweden. It was named after the mineralogist, Hans Ramberg (1917–1998).

It is a member of the wurtzite group and is chemically related to hauerite.
