= Iron oxalate =

Iron oxalate may refer to the following:

- Iron(II) oxalate, Fe(C_{2}O_{4})
- Ferric oxalate, Fe_{2}(C_{2}O_{4})_{3}
