= Manganese(II) selenide =

- Mn^{2+} Se^{2−}

Names
- IUPAC name Manganese(II) selenide

Identifiers
CAS Number	1313-22-0
3D model (JSmol)	Interactive image
ChemSpider	66598
ECHA InfoCard	100.013.822
EC Number	215-203-1
PubChem CID	73970
UNII	8R9E626WPL
- InChI: InChI=1S/Mn.Se Key: UMUKXUYHMLVFLM-UHFFFAOYSA-N
- SMILES: [Mn+2].[Se-2]

Properties
Chemical formula	MnSe
Molar mass	133.9 g/mol
Appearance	gray solid
Density	5.59 g/cm^{3} (20 °C)
Melting point	1,460 °C (2,660 °F; 1,730 K)
Solubility in water	insoluble

Structure
Crystal structure	cubic, cF8
Space group	Fm3̅m (No. 225)
Coordination geometry	Octahedral

Related compounds
Other anions	Manganese(II) oxide Manganese(II) sulfide Manganese(II) telluride
- Except where otherwise noted, data are given for materials in their standard state (at 25 °C [77 °F], 100 kPa). Infobox references

Manganese(II) selenide is an inorganic compound with the chemical formula MnSe. It is a dense gray solid that dissolves only by reaction.

Manganese(II) selenide can be synthesized by the reaction of selenium powder and manganese(II) acetate in an alkaline solution with a reducing agent such as hydrazine at 180°C.

Manganese selenide exists in three polymorphs. Most common is the stable α-phase (NaCl type). There is also a metastable γ-phase (wurtzite type) and an unstable β phase (zincblende type).
