= Manganese diselenide =

Manganese(II) diselenide
Identifiers
CAS Number	12299-98-8
3D model (JSmol)	Interactive image
ChemSpider	74897
ECHA InfoCard	100.032.323
EC Number	235-569-6
PubChem CID	83014
UNII	VJ084QU1P0
CompTox Dashboard (EPA)	DTXSID0065301
- InChI: InChI=1S/Mn.2Se Key: KDAKOPXAEMJUSU-UHFFFAOYSA-N
- SMILES: [Mn](=[Se])=[Se]

Properties
Chemical formula	MnSe_{2}
Molar mass	212.880 g·mol^{−1}
Appearance	grey, odorless powder
Density	5.55 g/cm^{3}
Solubility in water	insoluble

Hazards
- GHS labelling
Pictograms	(GHS06: Toxic) (GHS08: Health hazard) (GHS09: Environmental hazard)
Signal word	Danger
Hazard statements	H301, H331, H373, H410
- Except where otherwise noted, data are given for materials in their standard state (at 25 °C [77 °F], 100 kPa). verify (what is ?) Infobox references

Manganese diselenide is the inorganic compound with the formula MnSe_{2}. This rarely encountered solid is structurally similar to that of iron pyrite (FeS_{2}). Analogous to the description of iron pyrite, manganese diselenide is sometimes viewed as being composed of Mn^{2+} and Se_{2}^{2−} ions, although being a semiconductor, MnSe_{2} is not appropriately described in formal oxidation states.

== Spectroscopy ==
The high‐resolution Mn 2p spectra of the MnSe_{2} has two distinct peaks at 642.2 and 653.9 electronvolts correspond to the Mn 2p3/2 and Mn 2p1/2 spin–orbit components, respectively. The energy difference (Δ 2p) of 11.7 eV confirms the presence of Mn^{4+} ions in the sample. A good correlation was observed with the literature value for the Mn^{4+} state. No peaks for Mn^{2+} ions were observed at 640–641 eV, which confirmed the formation of only the Mn^{4+} oxidation state with a d^{3} electronic configuration. The Se 3d spectra were deconvoluted into two well‐defined peaks (3d5/2 and 3d3/2) at a binding energy of 54.46 and 55.31 eV, respectively. These two peaks confirmed the presence of Se^{2−} ions in MnSe_{2}.
