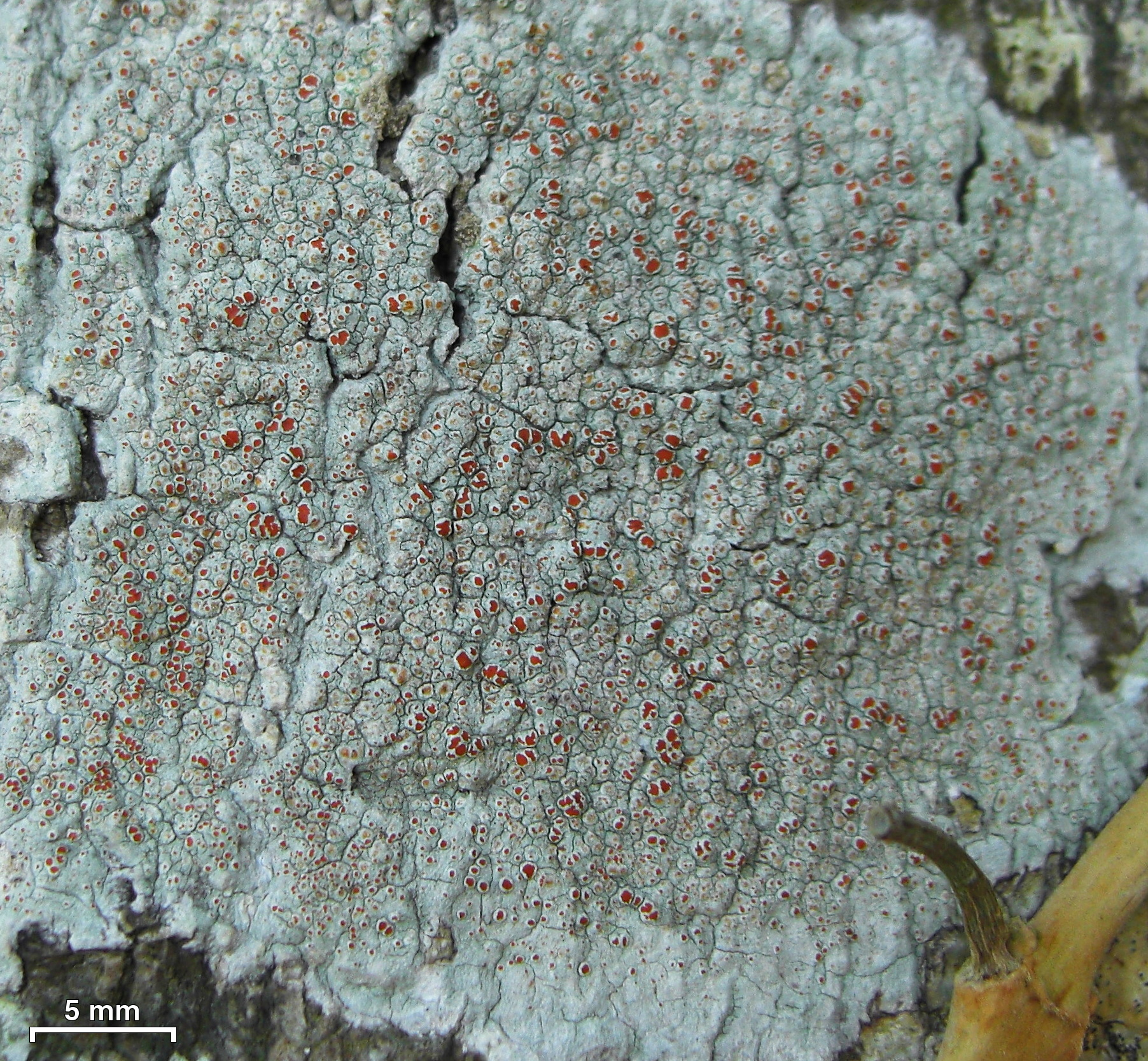

Scientific classification
- Kingdom: Fungi
- Division: Ascomycota
- Class: Lecanoromycetes
- Order: Lecanorales
- Family: Haematommataceae
- Genus: Haematomma
- Species: H. accolens

Binomial name
- Haematomma accolens (Stirt.) Hillmann (1940)

Synonyms
- List: Arthonia accolens Stirt. (1879); Lecanora punicea var. accolens Stirt. (1881); Lecania punicea var. accolens (Stirt.) Müll.Arg. (1892); Haematomma puniceum var. accolens (Stirt.) Zahlbr. (1928)

= Haematomma accolens =

Species of lichen

Haematomma accolens, commonly known as the tree bloodspot, is a species of crustose lichen in the family Haematommataceae. It forms thin to moderately thick patches on tree bark, appearing yellowish-white to greenish-grey in colour, and features vivid red to deep reddish-orange spore-producing structures (apothecia). The lichen typically grows on the bark of deciduous trees in warm-temperate and subtropical regions, particularly favouring smooth-barked trees such as oaks and maples in shaded forest environments. Since its description by the Scottish botanist James Stirton in 1881, it has been found across the Southeastern United States, Central and South America, parts of Africa, India, Sri Lanka, China, and northeastern Australia, where it plays a role in forest ecosystems by contributing to nutrient cycling and providing microhabitats for small invertebrates.

== Taxonomy ==
Haematomma accolens was first described and named by James Stirton in 1879; he classified it as a variety of Lecanora punicea. Johannes Hillmann promoted it to species status in 1940. It is commonly known as the "tree bloodspot".

== Description ==
The crustose thallus of Haematomma accolens ranges from thin to moderately thick, with a texture varying from smooth to slightly roughened or cracked. The thallus appears yellowish white to greenish-grey, occasionally showing darker tones. It lacks specialised reproductive structures like soredia or isidia. Occasionally, a white, fibrous Prothallus can be seen at the edges of the lichen.

The apothecia, or spore-producing structures, are vivid red to deep reddish-orange and measure 0.6–1.5 mm in diameter. They are typically flat with smooth or slightly roughened margins that remain well-defined, sometimes becoming flexuose with age. The apothecial disc is smooth and never pruinose (dusty-looking). The hymenium (spore-bearing layer) is colourless, while the epihymenium (uppermost layer of the apothecium) is orange, reacting purple in potassium hydroxide (K) before fading. The hypothecium (layer beneath the hymenium) is pale yellow or colourless.

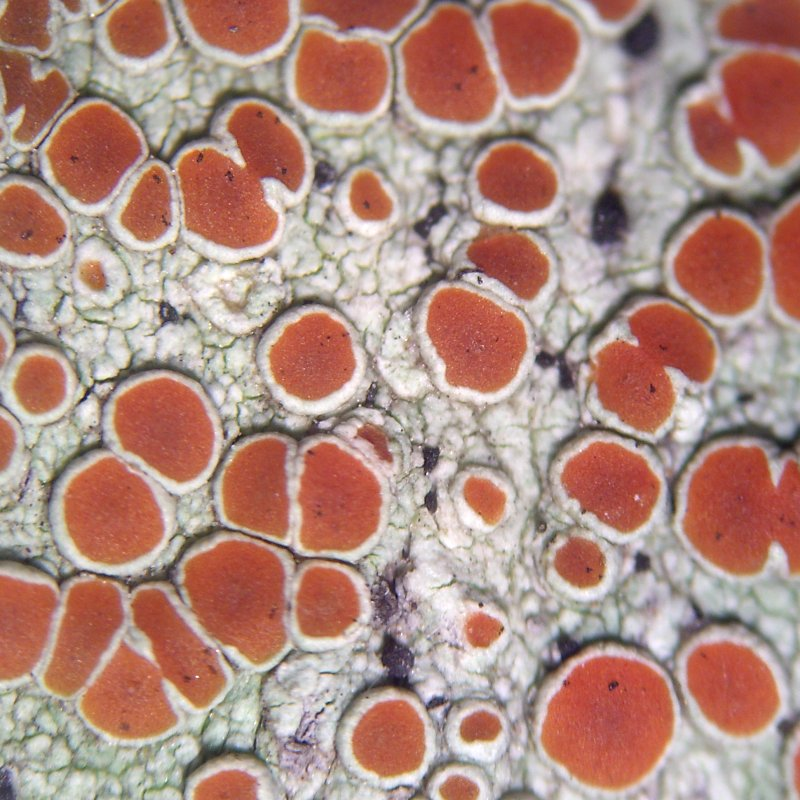
Close-up of apothecia showing their distinctive reddish-orange discs and pale, raised margins. The apothecia measure 0.6–1.5 mm in diameter and are set against the whitish-grey thallus.

Spores are long and spindle-shaped, measuring 36–68 μm in length and 3–5 μm in width, with 6–8 septa dividing them into sections. They are typically straight or slightly curved and align parallel in the ascus. Conidia (asexual spores), though rarely observed, are short and rod-shaped, measuring 5–7 μm long.

== Chemistry ==
Haematomma accolens contains atranorin and placodiolic acid in its thallus, while the apothecia contain the anthraquinone pigment haematommone, which is responsible for their vibrant red colouration. These compounds contribute to its chemical reactions: the thallus is UV-inactive, while the apothecia react with K to produce a deep purple-red reaction that completely dissipates, leaving the epihymenium colourless. Although the precise function of the red pigmentation is not known, it has been assumed to provide a protective function for the delicate spore-producing hymenium.

In some specimens, traces of isousnic acid have been detected via high-performance liquid chromatography, suggesting potential chemical variability within the species. The combination of placodiolic acid in the thallus and haematommone in the apothecia helps distinguish H. accolens from chemically similar species such as Haematomma flexuosum.

== Similar species ==
Haematomma accolens resembles Haematomma flexuosum, though their chemical compositions differ. While H. accolens produces placodiolic acid, H. flexuosum contains isopseudoplacodiolic and isoplacodiolic acids. The two also differ slightly in conidial size, with those of H. flexuosum being somewhat wider.

Morphologically, both species share a crustose thallus and vivid reddish apothecia, but H. accolens is typically characterised by smoother apothecial margins that lack the irregular flexuous shape sometimes seen in H. flexuosum. Additionally, H. accolens tends to occur on a broader range of tree species, while H. flexuosum may be more restricted in its host preference.

Other Haematomma species such as H. persoonii and H. ochroleucum can also be confused with H. accolens, but they differ in spore size and apothecial pigments. For example, H. persoonii has smaller, less septate spores and often crowded apothecia, while H. ochroleucum is distinguished by the presence of porphyrilic acid and a different range of thallus colours.

== Habitat, distribution, and ecology ==
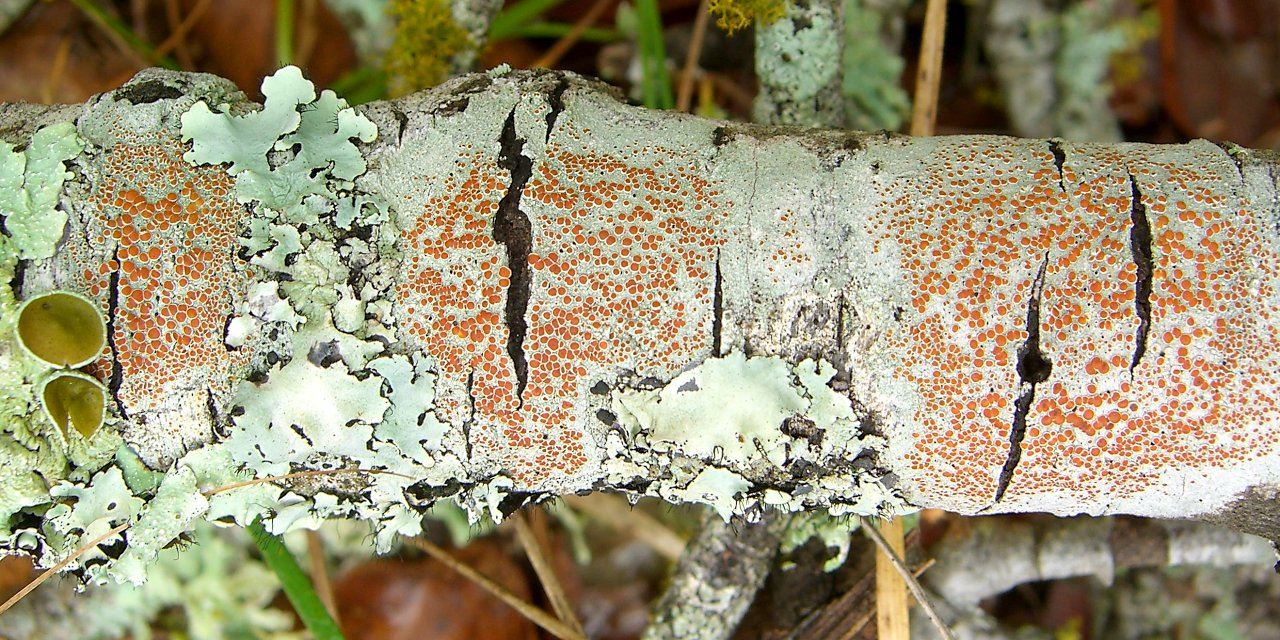
The tree bloodspot is shown growing amongst other bark-dwelling species; scale bar = 5 mm

Haematomma accolens grows on the deciduous tree bark in warm-temperate and subtropical regions. It commonly occurs on smooth-barked trees, including Quercus (oak), Acer rubrum (red maple), and Carya (hickory), but it is also found on other genera including Fagus (beech), Ilex (holly), Liquidambar (sweetgum), Magnolia, Nyssa (tupelo), Persea (bay trees), and Michelia. The species grows in shaded to semi-shaded forest environments.

Haematomma accolens occurs mainly in the southeastern United States. It has been recorded from North Carolina to northern Florida, with scattered occurrences extending westward to eastern Texas. Beyond North America, the species is also known from the West Indies, Costa Rica, Guatemala, Brazil, parts of Africa, India, and northeastern Australia. Reports from Malaysia are tentative and require further verification. In Asia, it is known from Sri Lanka, and it was recollected in India after a gap of almost 136 years since its original type collection from the state of Assam. The lichen was recorded as new to China in 2019, at elevations ranging from 400 to 1,230 m (1,310 to 4,040 ft).

Ecologically, H. accolens is part of lichen communities on tree bark, where it contributes to nutrient cycling and provides microhabitats for small invertebrates. Its preference for deciduous hosts and its distribution suggest an adaptation to regions with distinct seasons and relatively high humidity.
