= Haematomma eremaeum =

Scientific classification
- Kingdom: Fungi
- Division: Ascomycota
- Class: Lecanoromycetes
- Order: Lecanorales
- Family: Haematommataceae
- Genus: Haematomma
- Species: H. eremaeum

Binomial name
- Haematomma eremaeum R.W.Rogers (1982)

Synonyms
- Haematomma pruinosum R.W.Rogers (1982)

Species of lichen-forming fungus

Haematomma eremaeum is a bark-dwelling crustose lichen in the family Haematommataceae. It is a small lichen that grows on the bark of trees and shrubs in dry inland areas of Western Australia, where it appears as a greyish crust. The species is distinguished by its tiny red-coloured fruiting bodies, and by the presence of a rare chemical compound in its tissues. It was first formally described in 1982 when lichenologist Roderick Rogers revised the Australian species in its genus.

== Taxonomy ==
Haematomma eremaeum was described as a new species by Roderick W. Rogers in 1982, in a revision of the Australian bark-dwelling species of Haematomma. The type collection is from Western Australia, about 3.2 km (2 mi) north-west of Ongerup, collected from dead twigs of Melaleuca hamulosa; the holotype is housed in the Western Australian Herbarium (PERTH). The original description distinguished the species by a combination of morphology, spore characters, and chemistry. It has an esorediate thallus, sessile apothecia constricted at the base and lacking pruina, and thallus chemistry that includes atranorin and placodiolic acid. The apothecia contain acetone-soluble pigments (A and C), and the epithecium shows a magenta to grey-magenta K reaction. In the identification key, it is separated from similar Australian species by the presence of placodiolic acid and its restriction to Western Australian. It was compared with H. puniceum, which has spores with more septa and different apothecial pigments, and tends to occur in wetter areas with summer-dominant rainfall rather than semi-arid districts where most rain falls in winter.

The similar taxon Haematomma pruinosum, also described by Rogers in 1982, was distinguished by its densely pruinose apothecia and ascospores with fewer septa (three to six rather than five to eleven). It is now considered a synonym of H. eremaeum.

== Description ==
The thallus of Haematomma eremaeum is crustose and typically grey to yellowish-grey. It is somewhat granular to areolate (broken into small, angular patches). It does not form soredia, and the cortex is poorly developed. The fruiting bodies (apothecia) are sessile and noticeably constricted at the base, reaching about 1 mm in diameter. They have a prominent thalline margin (a rim formed from thallus tissue) that may be smooth or slightly irregular, and an epruinose disc that is greyish-red to reddish-brown. Each ascus contains eight spores. The ascospores are helically coiled in the ascus and are asymmetric. They are transversely 5–11-septate (with 5–11 cross-walls) and measure about 35–55 × 5–7.5 micrometres (length × width). Chemically, the thallus contains atranorin and placodiolic acid, and the apothecia contain acetone-soluble pigments A and C. The epithecium reacts K+ by turning magenta to grey-magenta, with no colour diffusion.

== Habitat and distribution ==
Haematomma eremaeum is a bark-dwelling species from southern Western Australia, described as endemic to a dry, mostly inland region. In eastern Australia, most Haematomma are largely confined to the humid coastal strip. In Western Australia the genus occurs well inland, and Haematomma eremaeum is associated with semi-arid areas where most rainfall occurs in winter. It has been collected on bark and twigs of woody plants, including dead twigs of Melaleuca hamulosa at the type locality, and also on Acacia (including dead Acacia and Acacia acuminata). Most Australian Haematomma favour smooth-barked trees; in the 1982 revision, Haematomma eremaeum was the only species described as common on rough bark. Reported localities span multiple inland and southern sites in Western Australia, including areas around Lake Barlee, Wongan Hills, Kondinin, Kulin, Pingelly, Boddington, and Lake King, as well as near Wagin and Borden.

Lichenostigma hyalosporum is a lichenicolous (lichen-dwelling) fungus that grows on H. eremaeum.
