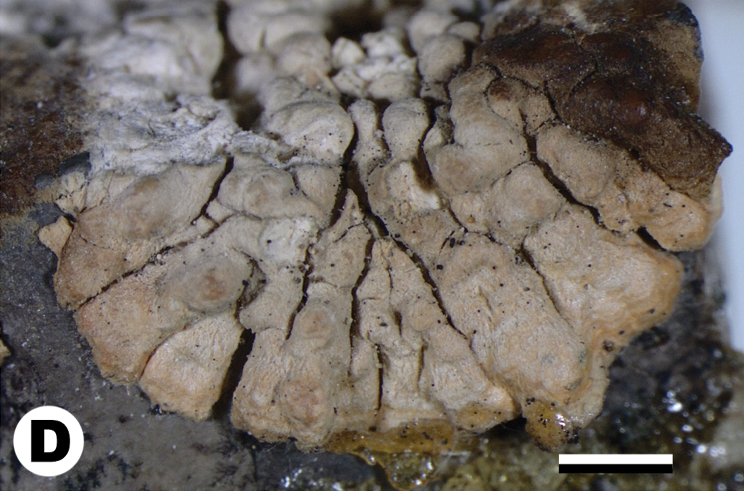

Scientific classification
- Kingdom: Fungi
- Division: Ascomycota
- Class: Lecanoromycetes
- Order: Pertusariales
- Family: Varicellariaceae
- Genus: Varicellaria
- Species: V. kasandjeffii

Binomial name
- Varicellaria kasandjeffii (Szatala) I.Schmitt & Lumbsch (2012)

Synonyms
- Pertusaria kasandjeffii Szatala (1930)

= Varicellaria kasandjeffii =

Species of lichen-forming fungus

Varicellaria kasandjeffii is a species of crustose lichen in the family Varicellariaceae. It forms a thick, milk-white crust dotted with small rounded to cylindrical bumps, and grows on volcanic rock in mountainous regions of southeastern Europe. Originally described in 1930 from Bulgaria's Rhodope Mountains, the species was later transferred to the genus Varicellaria based on its discoid fruiting bodies and distinctive chemistry, which includes lecanoric and variolaric acids.

== Taxonomy ==
Varicellaria kasandjeffii was originally described by Ödön Szatala in 1930 as Pertusaria kasandjeffii in the second part of his account of the Bulgarian lichen flora. In his protologue he listed it among several species he considered new to science and provided a Latin diagnosis based on material collected in June 1929 on eruptive rock on Mount Turluka in the Cepelarska Planina (Rhodope Mountains) near Pasmakli at about 1,500 m elevation. Szatala characterised the species as having a moderately thick, milk-white, cracked crust lacking soredia and isidia, with numerous thallus-coloured, globose to short cylindrical pseudostromata that grade into the surrounding thallus and are usually about 1.2 mm wide or less. Chemical spot tests on this material showed the thallus medulla and pseudostromata to be C+ and KC+ (red) while remaining K− and iodine-negative, and Szatala noted that he had not seen any true apothecia.

Later authors regarded P. kasandjeffii as a rare south-eastern European species, known only from a few localities in Bulgaria and Romania. On the basis of Szatala's type material, the species has been interpreted as having a relatively thick, bullate to warted thallus without soralia, but sharing the same lecanoric- and variolaric acid chemistry as Pertusaria lactea, making its separation from that taxon problematic and in need of further field collections.

A broad molecular and morphological study of Pertusaria and related genera by Schmitt and co-workers showed that the traditional, wide concept of Pertusaria is polyphyletic. Species with disciform apothecia, a non-amyloid hymenial gel, strongly amyloid, one- or two-spored asci, and one- or two-celled, thick-walled ascospores form a well-supported clade that is distinct from Pertusaria in the strict sense; all members of this clade produce lecanoric acid as the principal secondary metabolite, sometimes with lichexanthone or variolaric acid. The authors expanded the circumscription of the genus Varicellaria to encompass this group and formally transferred seven species into it, including Szatala's species as Varicellaria kasandjeffii (Szatala) Schmitt & Lumbsch. Because no fresh material was available, V. kasandjeffii was placed in Varicellaria on morphological and chemical grounds rather than DNA data, and Schmitt and colleagues explicitly noted its close similarity to V. lactea, differing mainly in its esorediate, thick, bullate thallus.
