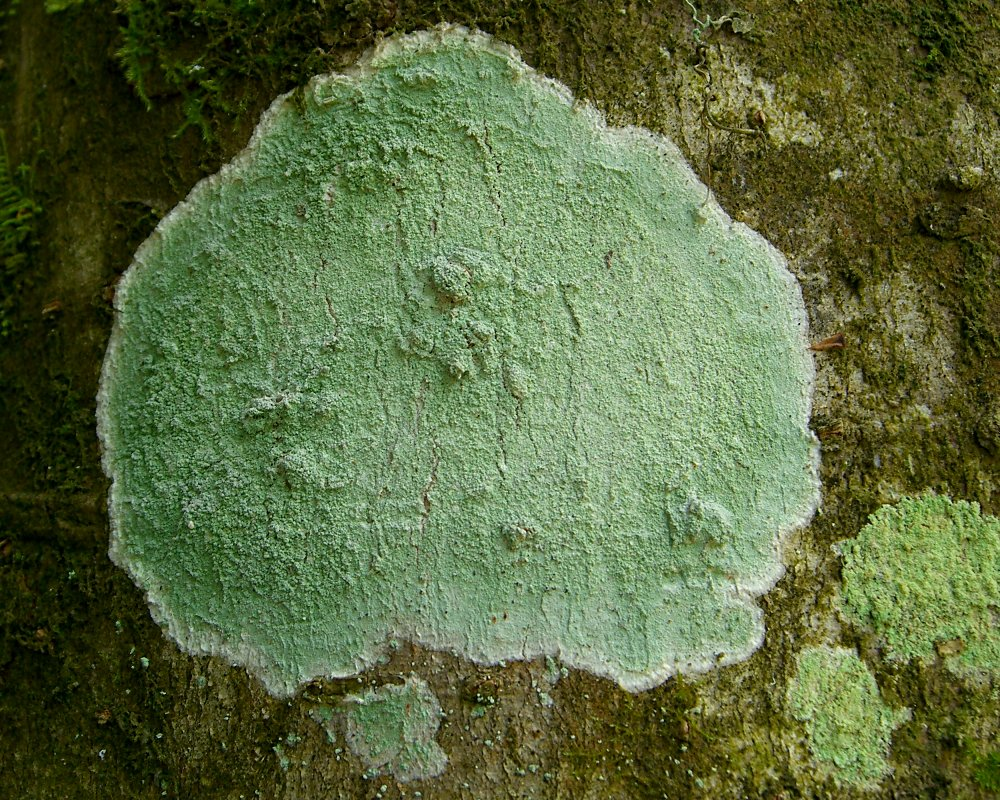

Scientific classification
- Kingdom: Fungi
- Division: Ascomycota
- Class: Lecanoromycetes
- Order: Pertusariales
- Family: Pertusariaceae
- Genus: Verseghya
- Species: V. thysanophora

Binomial name
- Verseghya thysanophora (R.C.Harris) S.Y.Kondr., Lőkös, Farkas & Hur (2019)

Synonyms
- Lecanora thysanophora R.C.Harris (2000)

= Verseghya thysanophora =

Species of lichen

Verseghya thysanophora, commonly known as the mapledust lichen, is a species of mostly corticolous (bark-dwelling), leprose lichen in the family Pertusariaceae. This common species is widely distributed in the Northern Hemisphere. The thallus of the lichen is a thin patchy layer of granular soredia, pale green to yellowish green in colour. The main characteristics of the lichen include the presence of lichen products known as thysanophora unknowns, and the conspicuous white, fibrous prothallus that encircles the thallus.

== Taxonomy ==
The species was first formally described as Lecanora thysanophora by lichenologist Richard C. Harris in 2000. The type specimen was collected in 1996 by William Buck on the trail to the Gulf Unique Area in Mooers, New York; there, in conifer-maple woodland, it was found growing on a maple tree. The taxon was transferred to the newly circumscribed genus Verseghya in 2019 by Sergey Kondratyuk and colleagues.

In North America, the common name "mapledust lichen" is sometimes used to refer to this species.

== Description ==
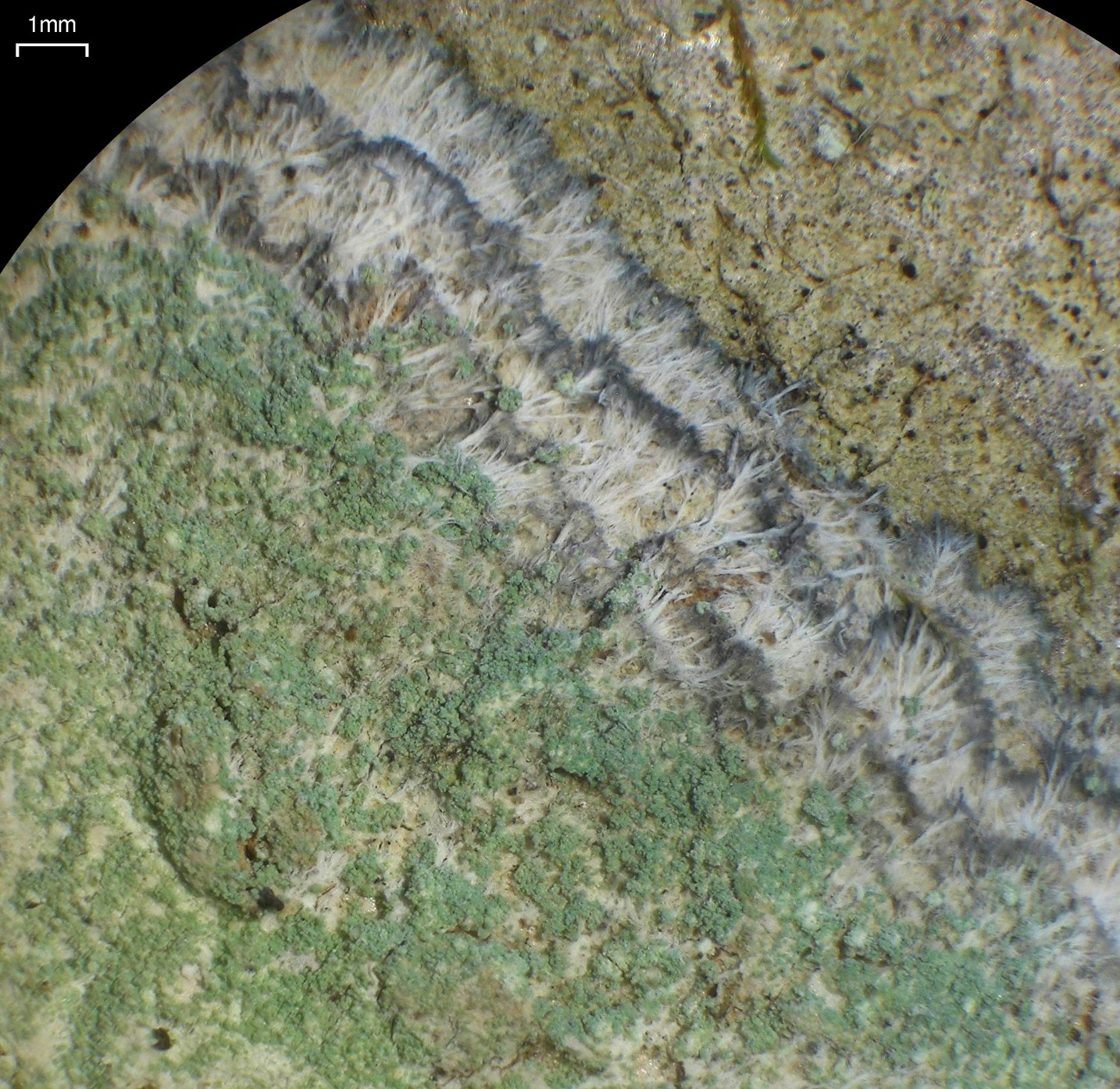
Closeup (10X magnification) of fibrous white prothallus

Verseghya thysanophora is pale yellow to greenish in colour, sometimes with blue or grey tones in shaded areas. It has a thin, leprose and sometimes patchy appearance. A visible, white and fibrous prothallus is often present with hyphae arranged in distinct radiating strands. Soralia can be either discrete or form a continuous crust. The lichen has a green algal photobiont (trebouxioid) that is 8–12 μm in diameter.

Apothecia, which are the reproductive structures of lichens, are rarely seen but can sometimes be abundant. They are pale yellowish brown to greyish brown in colour, and the margins are raised and distinctly yellow or whitish, which can contrast with the colour of the thallus. Asci contain eight spores and measure up to 90 by 20 μm; they are of the Lecanora-type, with a distinct tholus but lacking an ocular chamber. The ascospores lack any septa, and are hyaline and ellipsoid, with dimensions of 11–14 by 6–9 μm.

Verseghya thysanophora contains a set of unidentified terpenoids that have been named "thysanophora unknowns." These substances can be detected using thin-layer chromatography, and they appear ice blue under long wavelength UV light after charring. The lichen also contains atranorin, usnic acid, and zeorin; porphyrilic acid is present in about a quarter of collected specimens.

=== Similar species ===
Verseghya thysanophora is often confused with Lepraria, but this genus lack the white fimbriate margin and patchiness of parts of the thallus found in Verseghya thysanophora. Lepraria species are usually restricted to tree bases, while Verseghya thysanophora is commonly found higher up on the trunk and can form large patches. Lecanora expallens is similar in colour, but has a more coastal distribution, contains different chemical compounds, and has a bluish-grey prothallus. Sterile specimens of Verseghya thysanophora are morphologically similar to the European lichen Haematomma ochroleucum, but can be distinguished by the presence of thysanophora unknowns in Verseghya thysanophora, which are not found in Haematomma ochroleucum. In a 2005 study, it was found that all Lithuanian specimens identified previously as Haematomma ochroleucum were in fact Verseghya thysanophora; a similar situation was reported with Polish herbarium specimens.

== Habitat and distribution ==
Verseghya thysanophora is commonly found growing on the trunks of deciduous trees, especially Acer saccharum and Thuja occidentalis, as well as occasionally on shaded siliceous rocks. This lichen is typically found in mature maple forests, and is most often fertile on trees that are located near streams. It is widespread throughout the East Temperate region of North America. In Europe, it has been recorded from Austria, Belarus, Bulgaria, Germany, Poland, and Slovenia. In 2011, it was reported from Jinzhai County, China, and in 2015, in South America, from Santana do Livramento, Brazil.
