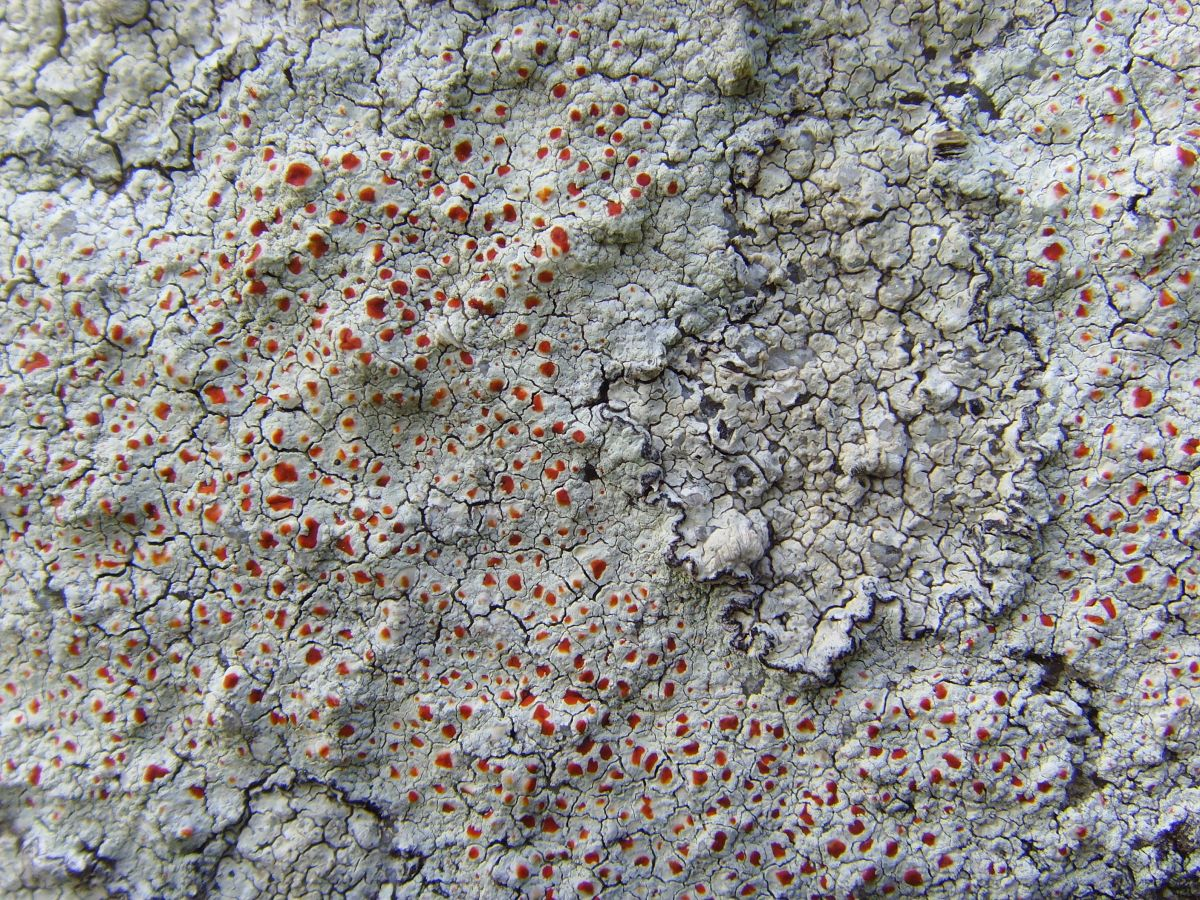
- Haematomma ochroleucum

Scientific classification
- Kingdom: Fungi
- Division: Ascomycota
- Class: Lecanoromycetes
- Order: Lecanorales
- Family: Haematommataceae; Hafellner (1984)
- Genus: Haematomma; A.Massal. (1852)

Type species
- Haematomma vulgare A.Massal. (1852)

Synonyms
- Lepadolemma Trevis. (1852)

= Haematomma =

Genus of lichens

Haematomma is a genus of crustose lichens established by Abramo Bartolommeo Massalongo in 1852. It is the sole genus in the Haematommataceae, a family circumscribed by Josef Hafellner in 1984. Commonly called bloodstain lichens, the species assigned to this genus are widely distributed in tropical and temperate areas.

The genus name Haematomma means "bloody eye", a reference to the color of the lichen's apothecia.

== Species ==
As of September 2021, Species Fungorum accepts 22 species in the genus Haematomma:

- Haematomma accolens (Stirt.) Hillmann (1940)
- Haematomma africanum (J.Steiner) C.W.Dodge (1971)
- Haematomma alborussulum (Nyl.) S.Ekman & J.Gerasimova (2017)
- Haematomma caperaticum Brodo, W.L.Culb. & C.F.Culb. (2008)
- Haematomma collatum (Stirt.) C.W.Dodge (1971)
- Haematomma eremaeum R.W.Rogers (1982)
- Haematomma fenzlianum A.Massal. (1861)
- Haematomma flexuosum Hillmann (1938)
- Haematomma fluorescens Kalb & Staiger (1995)
- Haematomma gallowayi Brodo (2007)
- Haematomma infuscum (Stirt.) R.W.Rogers (1982)
- Haematomma nicoyense Nelsen, Lücking & Chaves (2006)
- Haematomma nothofagi Kalb & Staiger (1995)
- Haematomma ochroleucum (Neck.) J.R.Laundon (1970)
- Haematomma parda Aptroot (2007)
- Haematomma persoonii (Fée) A.Massal. (1860)
- Haematomma pluriseptatum R.Tang (2020)
- Haematomma puniceum (Ach.) A.Massal. (1860)
- Haematomma rubidum R.Tang & Z.T.Zhao (2020)
- Haematomma rufidulum (Fée) A.Massal. (1860)
- Haematomma similis Bagl. (1875)
- Haematomma sorediatum R.W.Rogers (1982)
- Haematomma staigeriae Nelsen, Lücking & L.Umaña (2006)
- Haematomma stevensiae R.W.Rogers (1982)
