= Haematomma fluorescens =

Scientific classification
- Kingdom: Fungi
- Division: Ascomycota
- Class: Lecanoromycetes
- Order: Lecanorales
- Family: Haematommataceae
- Genus: Haematomma
- Species: H. fluorescens

Binomial name
- Haematomma fluorescens Kalb & Staiger (1995)

Varieties
- H. fluorescens var. longisporum Nelsen, Lücking & E.Navarro (2006)

Species of lichen-forming fungus

Haematomma fluorescens is a species of corticolous (bark-dwelling) and crustose lichen in the family Haematommataceae. Found in the neotropics, it was formally described as a new species in 1995 by the lichenologists Klaus Kalb and Bettina Staiger. The type specimen was collected in the cordillera of Piribebuy in Paraguay; here it was found growing on the bark of Cinchona. The specific epithet refers to the fluorescence observed when the lichen is shone with a UV light; this is caused by the secondary compound known as lichexanthone. This compound readily distinguishes it from other members of Haematomma. The lichen also contains russulone. The variety Haematomma fluorescens var. longisporum, found in Costa Rica, was proposed in 2006. It differs from the nominal variety in having long ascospores that are 18–20 times as long as broad (measuring 75–120 by 4–6 μm) and in the number of septa (13–27). Haematomma fluorescens has been reported to occur in Costa Rica, Argentina, Bolivia, Brazil, Paraguay, and Venezuela.
