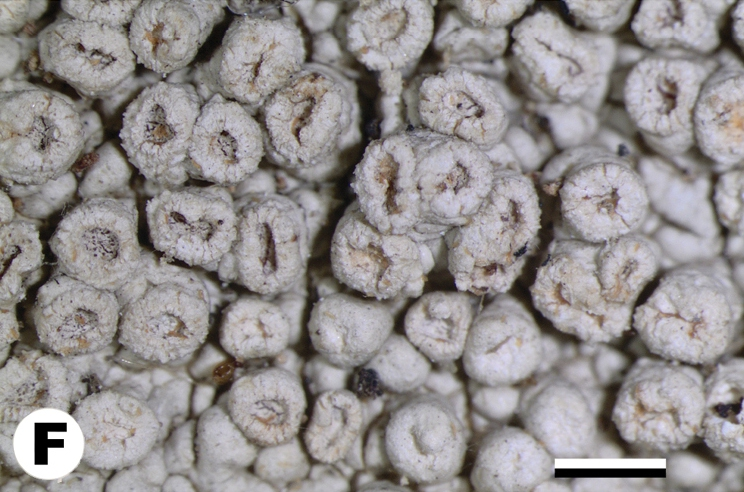
- Holotype specimen; scale bar = 1 mm

Scientific classification
- Kingdom: Fungi
- Division: Ascomycota
- Class: Lecanoromycetes
- Order: Pertusariales
- Family: Varicellariaceae
- Genus: Varicellaria
- Species: V. philippina

Binomial name
- Varicellaria philippina (Vain.) I.Schmitt & Lumbsch (2012)

Synonyms
- Pertusaria philippina Vain. (1913)

= Varicellaria philippina =

Species of lichen-forming fungus

Varicellaria philippina is a species of crustose lichen in the family Varicellariaceae. It was first described in 1913 in Mindanao, Philippines, and has since been found in Papua New Guinea as well. The lichen forms a whitish crust on tree bark and produces distinctive raised fruiting structures that contain large ascospores. Originally classified in the genus Pertusaria, it was transferred to Varicellaria in 2012 based on molecular and morphological evidence.

== Taxonomy ==
Varicellaria philippina was first described by the Finnish lichenologist Edvard August Vainio in 1913 as Pertusaria philippina. Vainio noted that its overall habit resembles Pertusaria velata. The species was transferred to Varicellaria by Imke Schmitt and H. Thorsten Lumbsch in 2012 following a molecular phylogenetics-informed restructuring of Pertusaria.

== Description ==
Varicellaria philippina is a crustose lichen with a somewhat thick, continuous thallus that is mostly smooth but can be slightly wrinkled, especially when young, where small wart-like beginnings of the fruiting bodies may appear. The thallus is whitish. In simple spot tests it reacts K− and C+ (red), the colour change being strong inside and faint on the surface. Soredia and isidia are absent. The medulla is I− (does not colour with iodine), and the hypothallus is whitish and indistinct.

The compound fruiting bodies (pseudostromata) are crowded and nearly touching, measuring 0.7–1(–1.5) mm across. They are raised, at first slightly depressed and rounded, later becoming irregularly cylindrical with a slightly narrowed base. Each pseudostroma contains one, occasionally two, apothecia. As they mature, the disc opens to about 0.5 mm wide, forming a shallow, urn-shaped cavity that is pale and somewhat bare. The margin is prominent, fairly smooth to slightly verruculose-crenulate, and the same colour as the thallus. Both the pseudostromata and the disc are K− and C+ (red).

The spores are two per ascus, colourless, oblong, and rounded to obtuse at the ends. They are non-gelatinous, with smooth walls about 6 μm thick, and measure 110–140 μm × 24–30 μm V. philippina is morphologically and chemically similar to V. velata, as noted by Vainio, but V. velata has single-spored asci.

== Habitat and distribution ==
The species was described from Mindanao, Lanao District, Camp Keithley near Lake Lanao, based on a collection made by Mary Strong Clemens (no. 1302) from the trunk of a broad-leaved tree. It has also been collected from Papua New Guinea. Varicellaria philippina is one of three Varicellaria species that have been recorded from the Philippines.
