= Klára Verseghy =

Hungarian lichenologist (1930–2020)

- Born: 2 February 1930; Budapest
- Died: 3 November 2020 (aged 90)
- Scientific career
- Fields: Lichenology
- Institutions: Hungarian Natural History Museum
- Author abbrev. (botany): Verseghy

Klára Anna Verseghy (2 February 1930 – 3 November 2020) was a Hungarian lichenologist. She was the curator of the lichen collection of the Hungarian Natural History Museum in Budapest from 1958 to 1985.

== Biography ==
Klára Verseghy was born in Budapest on 2 February 1930 to parents Károly Verseghy (an officer) and Gabriella Uhlai. All of her education was undertaken in Budapest, including elementary, secondary grammar school, and university. She graduated from Eötvös Loránd University in 1953 as a teacher of biology and chemistry. Soon after she started employment at the Hungarian Natural History Museum. After starting as a librarian, in 1958 she became curator of the lichen collections, assuming a position previously held by prominent Hungarian lichenologist Ödön Szatala. She held this position for 32 years, until her retirement in 1985.

In 1958, she defended her thesis Az európai Ochrolechia fajok monográfiája ("Monograph of the European Ochrolechia species") under her supervisor Szatala.

As part of her work in the lichen herbarium, Verseghy curated the extensive collections of Ferenc Fóriss, Vilmos Kőfaragó-Gyelnik and Szatala in the classification system proposed by Alexander Zahlbruckner. She separated the type specimens, and in 1964 used this collection to compile the type catalogue of the lichen collection, which ended up numbering more than 1000 specimens. Verseghy collected about 5,000 lichen specimens in several areas of Hungary, including Bakony, Hortobágy, Kiskunság, Vendvidék, Villány Mountains, Zemplén Mountains. An additional 1,500 specimens were from abroad–Finland, Norway, Poland, Romania, Slovakia, Sweden, Turkey and Ukraine were collecting destinations. Between 1969 and 1981 she issued two exsiccatae, namely Lichenotheca parva and Lichenes exsiccati, editi a sectione botanica musei historico-naturalis Hungarici. She published more than a hundred scientific and popular papers mainly on floristics, taxonomy, plant physiology, and bioindication. Verseghy introduced 46 new taxa (19 species, 27 varieties and forms) and 69 new combinations. She published taxonomic revisions of species from the genera Caloplaca, Gasparrinia, Ochrolechia, Squamaria, and Squamarina. Together with Edit Láng she initiated ecophysiological research on Hungarian lichens.

She prepared her main work, Magyarország zuzmó órájának kézikönyve ("The handbook of the Hungarian lichen flora") in 1994, during her retirement; this work contained descriptions of 715 lichens found in Hungary.

== Selected publications ==
Verseghy had 106 publications, including 23 that were about popular subjects; a complete listing in given in Farkas and colleagues' 2021 obituary. Some representative works are listed:

- Verseghy, K. (1956). "Studien über die Gattung Ochrolechia I". Annales Historico-Naturales Musei Nationalis Hungarici. nov. 7 (in German): 283–298.
- Verseghy, K. (1958). "Studien über die Gattung Ochrolechia II. Neue Flechten". Annales Historico-Naturales Musei Nationalis Hungarici. nov. 9 (in German). 50: 75–85.
- Verseghy, K. (1959). "Studien über die Gattung Ochrolechia III. Angaben zur Chemie der Ochrolechia-Arten". Annales Historico-Naturales Musei Nationalis Hungarici (in German). 51: 145–159.
- Verseghy, K. (1962). "Die Gattung Ochrolechia". Nova Hedwigia, Beihefte (in German). 1: 1–146.
- Verseghy, K. (1965). "Effect of dry periods on the spore production of lichens". Acta Biologica Hungarica. 16 (1): 85–104. PMID 5858047.
- Verseghy, K. (1968). "Nachtrag I. zum "Typenverzeichnis der Flechtensammlung in der Botanischen Abteilung des aUngarischen Naturwissenscha lichen Museums"". Fragmenta Botanica (in German). 6 (1–4): 41–55.
- Verseghy, K. (1973). "Caloplaca-Arten in Ungarn. (Hazai Caloplaca-fajok)". Studia botanica hungarica (in German). 8: 33–64.
- Verseghy, K.P. (1982). "Productivity and turnover of xerotherm lichen species". Acta Botanica Academiae Scientiarum Hungaricae. 28 (3–4): 411–425.
- Farkas, E.; Lőkös, L.; Verseghy, K. (1985). "Lichens as indicators of air pollution in the Budapest Agglomeration. I. Air pollution map based on floristic data and heavy metal concentration measurements". Acta Botanica Academiae Scientiarum Hungaricae. 31 (1–4): 45–68.
- Kauppi, Matti; Verseghy-Patay, Klara (1990). "Determination of the distribution of lichen substances in the thallus by fluorescence microscopy". Annales Botanici Fennici. 27 (2): 189–202. JSTOR 23725434.
- Lőkös, L.; Verseghy, P.K. (1999). "The lichen flora of the Kiskunság National Park and the southern part of the Danube–Tisza Interfluve". In Lőkös, L.; Rajczy, M. (eds.). The Flora of the Kiskunság National Park. Vol. 2. Cryptogams. Budapest: Magyar Természettudományi Múzeum. pp. 299–362. ISBN 978-9637093623.

== Eponyms ==
The lichen genus Verseghya S.Y.Kondr., Lőkös & Hur (2016) and the species Verseghya klarae S.Y. Kondr., Lőkös & Hur (2016), Nectriopsis verseghy-klarae S.Y.Kondr., Lőkös & Hur (2016), and Opegrapha verseghyklarae S.Y.Kondr., Lőkös & Hur (2015) are named after her.

== See also ==
- List of Hungarian botanists
