= Ödön Szatala =

Hungarian lichenologist (1889–1958)

- Born: 5 February 1889; Görbeszeg, Austria-Hungary (now Uličské Krivé, Slovakia)
- Died: 27 June 1958 (aged 69); Budapest, Hungary
- Education: University of Budapest
- Known for: Floristic and taxonomic studies on lichens of Hungary, the Balkans and western Asia
- Scientific career
- Fields: Lichenology, botany
- Workplaces: Royal Hungarian Experimental Station for Seed Testing; Eötvös Loránd University; Hungarian Natural History Museum
- Author abbrev. (botany): Szatala

Ödön Szatala (5 February 1889 – 27 June 1958) was a Hungarian lichenologist and botanist. He became one of the most prolific authors of lichen names in the 20th century, despite pursuing lichenology largely outside formal academic employment for most of his career. A catalogue by Klára Verseghy credited him with 72 new lichen species, 26 varieties and 71 forms, within a total of 583 new lichen names that also included new combinations and replacement names. He worked mainly on the lichen floras of Hungary, the Balkans, Anatolia, the Aegean region, Iran and other parts of western Asia, and also treated material from North Africa, New Guinea and elsewhere.

Verseghy described Szatala as an exceptionally active systematic worker whose publications, series such as Lichenes Hungariae and numerous regional floras, were intended as steps towards an unfinished lichen flora of the Carpathian Basin. Later typification and revision work has shown that many of his taxa continue to be relevant, although several required lectotypification or taxonomic reassessment.

== Early life and education ==
Szatala was born in the village of Görbeszeg, then in Austria-Hungary and now Uličské Krivé in eastern Slovakia. He attended secondary school in Ungvár and Munkács (now Uzhhorod and Mukachevo in Ukraine), before studying natural sciences at the University of Budapest from 1909 to 1913. In 1916 he obtained a doctorate with a thesis on the lichen flora of the county (comitat) of Ung in north-eastern Hungary, signalling an early and lasting specialisation in lichenology.

== Career ==
From 1913 until 1951 Szatala was employed in seed-testing work, being responsible for seed-control investigations at the Royal Hungarian Experimental Station for Seed Testing. He pursued lichenology alongside this applied position: he spent much of his spare time working with collections in the Department of Botany of the Hungarian Natural History Museum (herbarium BP) and building up his own extensive private herbarium.

In the early 1950s Szatala's lichenological work became more formally recognised. Between 1951 and 1954 he taught courses on lichen identification at the Eötvös Loránd University in Budapest, and in 1953 he was awarded the degree of Candidate of Sciences by the Hungarian Academy of Sciences. He was officially employed at the Hungarian Natural History Museum only in the last years of his life, from 1953 until his death in 1958, during which time he organised and revised the museum's extensive lichen collections.

== Research and publications ==
=== Taxonomic work ===
Szatala was a prolific taxonomic author. Klára Verseghy's catalogue of his names, published in 1963, recorded 583 new lichen names attributed to him: 72 new species, 26 new varieties, 71 new forms, two replacement names, 412 new combinations and 25 newly proposed synonyms. A later biographical account, summarising this work, noted that he described around 73 species, mainly in the genera Caloplaca, Diplotomma, Lecanora, Lecidea, and Pertusaria.

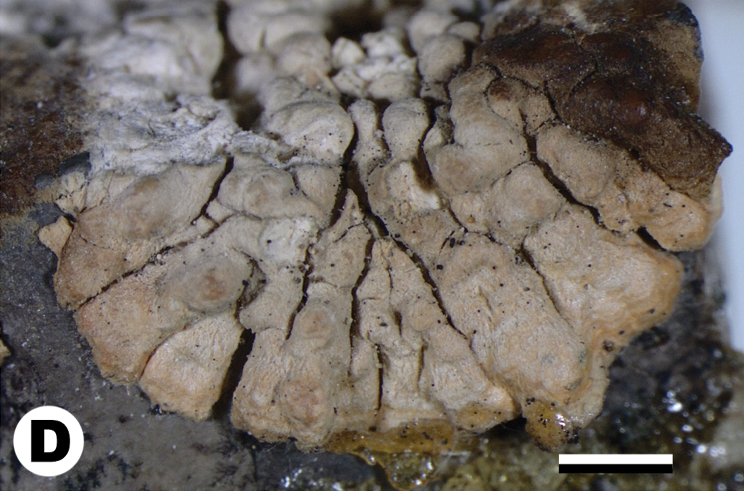
Varicellaria kasandjeffii (originally Pertusaria kasandjeffii) was described by Szatala in 1930.

Many of Szatala's names were based on his own field collections, but he also described taxa from material gathered by other botanists. Important sources included the collections of Hugó Lojka, František Nábělek, Karl Heinz Rechinger and others, some of which were made for the Natural History Museum, Vienna (herbarium W) and sent to Szatala for determination. As part of the arrangements with Rechinger and other collectors, Szatala retained duplicate or fragmentary material of many new taxa in his private herbarium; these were later transferred to BP when he became curator there, resulting in type material being split between Vienna, Munich and Budapest.

Subsequent work on his taxa has shown the scale and impact of this output. A lectotypification study published in 2014 examined original material for 27 names coined by Szatala, mainly based on collections from Greece, Hungary, Iran, Iraq, Jordan, Palestine, Romania, Turkey and Ukraine, and designated lectotypes where necessary. That study, together with others on individual genera, has clarified the application of several of his names, confirmed synonymies and resolved cases where earlier informal type citations had been overlooked or lost.

=== Floristic studies ===
Szatala's publications are largely floristic in character, treating the lichen vegetation of defined regions rather than single genera. Verseghy listed 54 such papers, including the multi-part series Adatok Magyarország zuzmóflórájának ismeretéhez ('Contributions to the knowledge of the lichen flora of Hungary'), the exsiccata-linked Lichenes Hungariae, and several instalments of Neue Flechten ('New lichens'). He also published regional lichen floras for Croatia (Velebit), the Tatra Mountains, Herzegovina, Bulgaria and the Balkans more broadly, often as contributions within larger botanical works by other authors.

Szatala aimed to synthesise these scattered studies into comprehensive floras. He produced a monograph on the coniocarpen lichens of Hungary and began a projected "lichen flora of the Carpathian Basin", of which only volumes I–III appeared in Folia Cryptogamica during his lifetime. Towards the end of his career he published a Prodromus of the lichen flora of Iran and a Prodrome of the lichen flora of New Guinea, based largely on collections made by other botanists and sent to him for determination.

=== Work on Turkish and Near Eastern lichens ===
An important part of Szatala's work concerned the lichen flora of Anatolia and neighbouring regions. Historical records show that, between 1791 and 1960, the majority of published lichen data from Turkey came from just two authors, Julius Steiner and Ödön Szatala. Szatala wrote several papers specifically on Turkish material, including treatments of collections by Györffy de Szigeth, Andrasovszky József, František Nábělek and others, some of which were published posthumously from his notes.

A later re-examination of Turkish specimens in the Hungarian Natural History Museum, comparing them with Szatala's original publications, showed that he had identified and published records for 178 infraspecific taxa from the country, as well as leaving a number of unpublished but labelled specimens. That study confirmed that some of his Turkish species, such as Acarospora anatolica and Caloplaca selinkae, were known only from their type localities and underlined the continuing importance of his determinations for reconstructing the early exploration of the region's lichen flora.

== Collections ==
Szatala assembled a large personal herbarium which, together with the material he curated at BP, has remained a significant resource for later taxonomic work. Hertel and co-authors estimated that his lichen collections comprised around 35,000 specimens, with a particular emphasis on the Balkans and Anatolia. As part of his curatorial work he also annotated and organised collections in Vienna (W) and other herbaria, marking type material and often transferring it into designated type cabinets, although some of these specimens were later lost or dispersed.

Subsequent studies have relied heavily on these collections, both for typification and for reconstructing historical distribution patterns. Revisions of Turkish material, for example, have tracked specimens cited in Szatala's papers and shown that some types are now preserved only at BP or W as a result of wartime losses in other herbaria.

== Legacy ==
Szatala died in Budapest in 1958, leaving several large projects unfinished, including his planned lichen flora of the Carpathian Basin and a flora of Bulgarian lichens initiated with support from the Bulgarian Academy of Sciences. His extensive output of names and regional treatments has nevertheless remained embedded in later taxonomic and floristic work, and modern catalogues, typification studies and regional checklists continue to address and refine the taxa he described.

Several lichen taxa have been named in his honour, including Peltigera szatalae Gyeln. (1927); Nephroma szatalae Gyeln. (1932); Pertusaria szatalai Erichsen (1936); Ochrolechia szatalaensis Verseghy (1958); and Lecanora szatalae Motyka (1996).

== Selected publications ==
- Szatala, Ödön (1916). "Adatok Ung vármegye zuzmóflórájának ismeretéhez. Contributions à la connaissance de la flore lichénologique du comitat Ung" [Contributions to the knowledge of the lichen flora of Ung County]. Botanikai Közlemények (in Hungarian). 15: 17–57.
- —————— (1926). "Revisio critica Coniocarpinearum Hungariae" [Critical revision of the coniocarpen lichens of Hungary]. Annales Historico-Naturales Musei Nationalis Hungarici (in Latin). 24: 99–135.
- —————— (1927). "Lichenes Hungariae. I" [Lichens of Hungary I]. Folia Cryptogamica (in Latin). 1 (5): 337–434.
- —————— (1940). "Contributions à la connaissance de la flore lichénologique de la péninsule des Balkans et de l'Asie Mineure" [Contributions to the knowledge of the lichen flora of the Balkan Peninsula and Asia Minor]. Borbásia (in French). 2 (3–10): 33–50.
- —————— (1956). "Prodrome de la flore lichénologique de la Nouvelle-Guinée" [Prodrome of the lichen flora of New Guinea]. Annales Historico-Naturales Musei Nationalis Hungarici, Series Nova (in French). 7: 15–50.
- —————— (1957). "Prodromus einer Flechtenflora des Irans" [Prodromus of a lichen flora of Iran]. Annales Historico-Naturales Musei Nationalis Hungarici, Series Nova (in German). 8: 101–154.
