= Haematomma stevensiae =

Scientific classification
- Kingdom: Fungi
- Division: Ascomycota
- Class: Lecanoromycetes
- Order: Lecanorales
- Family: Haematommataceae
- Genus: Haematomma
- Species: H. stevensiae

Binomial name
- Haematomma stevensiae R.W.Rogers (1982)

Species of lichen-forming fungus

Haematomma stevensiae is a species of bark-dwelling crustose lichen in the family Haematommataceae. It is found on the bark of mangrove trees in tropical coastal areas, particularly in Queensland, where it forms a white to grey-green crust on the tree surface. The species is named after Gweneth Nell Stevens in recognition of her pioneering work on lichens in Australian mangrove forests. Later studies have shown that populations resembling this species also occur in other Indo-Pacific regions, including Japan, Java, and the Philippines, suggesting a distribution extending well beyond its original Australian range.

== Taxonomy ==
Roderick W. Rogers described Haematomma stevensiae as a new species in 1982, in a revision of the Australian bark-dwelling (corticolous) species of Haematomma. The type specimen was collected in Queensland at Sunset Beach near Mackay (Eimeo Beach Creek), on the bark of Rhizophora (a mangrove), and is housed in the National Herbarium of Victoria (specimen MEL 1031269). Rogers distinguished the species from other Australian taxa by spore size and number of septa, its secondary chemistry, and the colour of its apothecia. In Rogers's identification key, it groups with species that contain both divaricatic acid and perlatolic acid and usually have spores longer than 50 μm (micrometres); these taxa mainly occur in coastal tropical habitats. The species epithet honours Gweneth Nell Stevens for her contributions to the study of lichens in Australian mangrove communities.

In a later discussion of the genus, Irwin Brodo and colleagues compared H. stevensiae with H. persoonii and H. collatum, noting that it is intermediate between them in spore septation and shares scattered, broadly sessile apothecia with H. collatum rather than the crowded apothecia typical of H. persoonii.

== Description ==
The thallus of Haematomma stevensiae is crustose and usually white to yellow-grey or grey-green. The surface is often uneven, ranging from areolate to granular; the granules can become distinctly swollen (bullate). It lacks soredia (powdery reproductive granules) and has a cortex (an outer surface layer). The apothecia (fruiting bodies) are typically sessile (sitting directly on the thallus) but may be almost short-stalked, and are up to about 2.5 mm across. Each apothecium has a well-developed thalline margin and an orange-red (rarely red) disc without pruina (a powdery coating). Each ascus contains eight ascospores. The ascospores are asymmetric, and are arranged straight or in a spiral within the ascus; they have 5–15 septa and measure about 50–65 × 4–5.5 μm. The thallus contains atranorin, perlatolic acid, and divaricatic acid. The apothecia lack pigments that dissolve in acetone. In cross-section, the epithecium gives a K+ (positive potassium hydroxide) reaction that turns magenta to grey-magenta and remains insoluble. Later chemical work on material identified as H. stevensiae reported a sphaerophorin-type chemistry, with two chemotypes differing in the relative proportions of sphaerophorin and isosphaeric acid; trace chloroatranorin and superlatolic acid were also reported.

== Habitat and distribution ==
As published, Haematomma stevensiae was known only from mangroves in tropical Queensland, where it appeared to be common. The type collection was made on Rhizophora at Sunset Beach near Mackay. Other collections come from mangrove localities including Trinity Bay, Hinchinbrook Island, Corio Bay, and Keppel Sands. It has been recorded on the bark of several mangrove trees, including Rhizophora, Aegiceras, and Excoecaria (including Excoecaria agallocha). Specimens have also been collected from the landward fringe (inner edge) of mangrove stands. Later herbarium studies examined additional material identified as H. stevensiae from outside Australia (including Japan, Java, and the Philippines), suggesting a wider Indo-Pacific distribution than was indicated at the time of its original description.
