= Haematomma nicoyense =

Scientific classification
- Kingdom: Fungi
- Division: Ascomycota
- Class: Lecanoromycetes
- Order: Lecanorales
- Family: Haematommataceae
- Genus: Haematomma
- Species: H. nicoyense

Binomial name
- Haematomma nicoyense Nelsen, Lücking & Chaves (2006)

Species of lichen

Haematomma nicoyense is a species of corticolous (bark-dwelling) lichen in the family Haematommataceae. Found in Costa Rica, it was formally described as a new species in 2006 by Matthew Nelsen, Robert Lücking, and José Luis Chaves. The type specimen was collected from the Monte Alto Forest Reserve in the Nicoya Peninsula at an elevation between 750 and 900 m (2,460 and 2,950 ft). Here, in lowland to lower montane moist forests, the species was found growing on the lower trunks of exposed trees and on fence posts. The specific epithet refers to the type locality.

The lichen has a greyish-white, areolate thallus that is cracked and measures 5 to 10 cm (2 to 4 in) across. Soralia are granular, and scattered across the thallus surface, measuring up to 1 mm in diameter. Ascospores number eight per ascus, and are narrowly fusiform (spindle-shaped) with between 3 and 6 septa and have dimensions of 40–65 by 3–4 μm. Lichen products found in Haematomma nicoyense include russulone, atranorin, and sphaerophorin.
