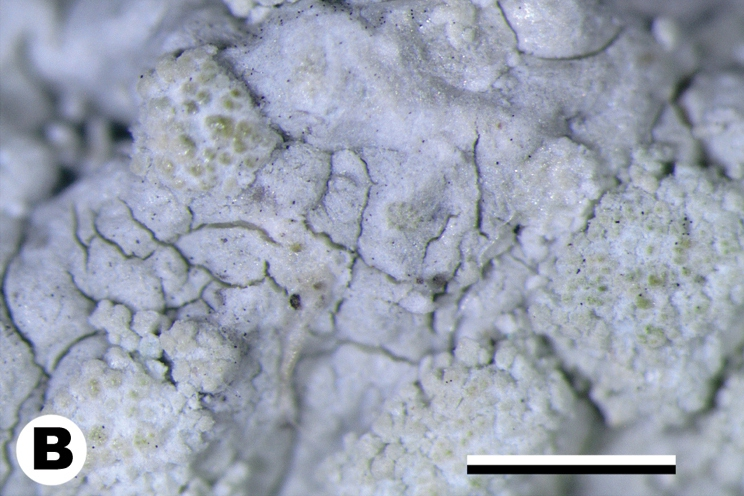

Scientific classification
- Kingdom: Fungi
- Division: Ascomycota
- Class: Lecanoromycetes
- Order: Pertusariales
- Family: Varicellariaceae
- Genus: Varicellaria
- Species: V. hemisphaerica

Binomial name
- Varicellaria hemisphaerica (Flörke) Schmitt & Lumbsch (2012)

Synonyms
- Variolaria hemisphaerica Flörke (1815); Pertusaria velata f. aspergilla Cromb. (1894); Pertusaria speciosa Høeg (1924); Pertusaria hemisphaerica (Flörke) Erichsen (1932); Pertusaria hibernica Erichsen (1938)

= Varicellaria hemisphaerica =

Species of lichen-forming fungus

Varicellaria hemisphaerica is a species of corticolous (bark-dwelling) crustose lichen belonging to the family Varicellariaceae. It has an almost cosmopolitan distribution.

== Taxonomy ==
The lichen was first formally described as a new species in 1815 by Heinrich Gustav Flörke, who classified it in the genus Variolaria. The type species was collected in Berlin, Germany. Christian Erichsen transferred the taxon to Pertusaria 1932. It was regarded as a member of that genus until Imke Schmitt and H. Thorsten Lumbsch reclassified it in Varicellaria in 2012, following molecular phylogenetics-informed restructuring of the polyphyletic Pertusaria.

== Description ==
Varicellaria hemisphaerica is a lichen that forms medium to thick growths in extended, conspicuous patches of pale bluish grey colouration. The prothallus (initial growth stage visible at the edges) is distinct, arranged in zones, and white in colour. The upper surface of the main body (thallus) ranges from smooth to uneven or warted in texture.

A distinctive feature of this lichen is its soralia—specialised structures for asexual reproduction—which measure 1–2 mm in diameter. These soralia are markedly convex (dome-shaped) and often merge together. The soredia (powdery propagules contained within the soralia) have a granular appearance, ranging from pale to the same colour as the thallus, and measure 40–100 μm in diameter. Apothecia, which are cup-like fruiting bodies for sexual reproduction, have not been observed in this species.

When tested with chemical spot tests, the soralia show characteristic reactions: they are C+ (carmine-red), K–, KC+ (red), and Pd–. Under ultraviolet light (UV), they may or may not display a glaucous (bluish-grey) fluorescence. These chemical reactions indicate the presence of lecanoric acid and an unidentified secondary metabolite in the lichen.

== Similar species ==
Varicellaria hemisphaerica can be distinguished from the closely related V. lactea by its substrate preference and morphological features: V. hemisphaerica grows exclusively on tree bark (corticolous), while V. lactea is found on rock surfaces (saxicolous). The species produces smaller soredia (40–100 μm in diameter) compared to V. lactea (110–180 μm). While both species contain lecanoric acid as their main secondary metabolite, the presence of variolaric acid can occur in both species and is not a reliable diagnostic feature. The thallus of V. hemisphaerica is typically pale bluish-grey, sometimes becoming pink in herbarium specimens, with a smooth and thin or cracked and thick texture, featuring convex soralia that are paler or the same colour as the thallus. Molecular phylogenetic studies have confirmed that V. hemisphaerica and V. lactea represent distinct species, with their divergence likely driven by their different substrate requirements. Both species associate with the same photobiont, Trebouxia sp. OTU A03.

== Habitat and distribution ==
In Nepal, Varicellaria hemisphaerica has been reported from 2,400 to 3,366 m elevation in a compilation of published records.
