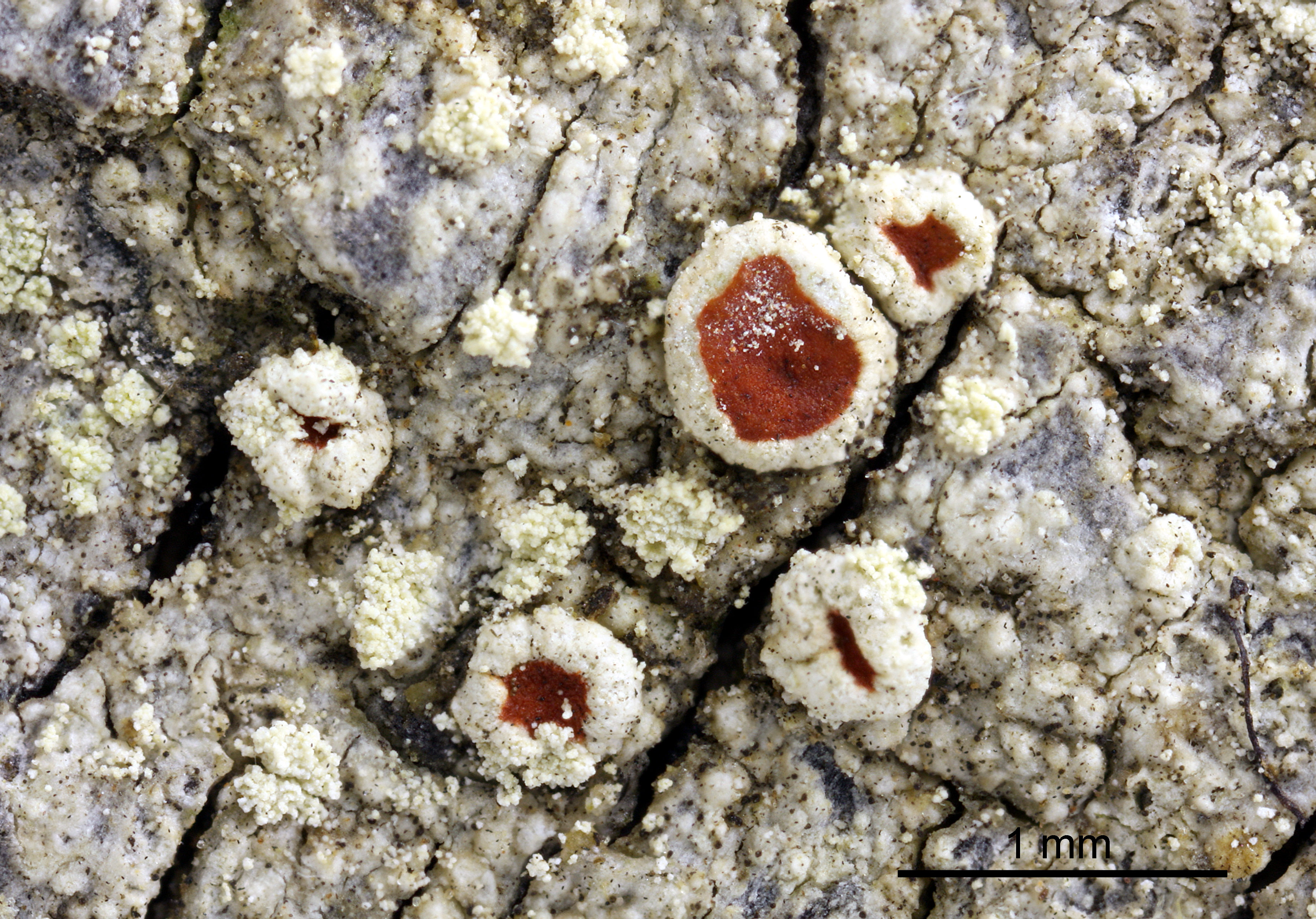
- H. sorediatum from Madeira, with characteristic pale thallus and red fruiting bodies; scale: 1 mm

Scientific classification
- Kingdom: Fungi
- Division: Ascomycota
- Class: Lecanoromycetes
- Order: Lecanorales
- Family: Haematommataceae
- Genus: Haematomma
- Species: H. sorediatum

Binomial name
- Haematomma sorediatum R.W.Rogers (1982)

Synonyms
- Haematomma neglectum Lumbsch & Feige (1994)

= Haematomma sorediatum =

Species of lichen-forming fungus

Haematomma sorediatum is a species of corticolous (bark-dwelling) crustose lichen in the family Haematommataceae. It is distinctive among its relatives for producing soredia (powdery asexual reproductive particles containing fungal and algal cells) in small, round soralia; these soredia can disperse and form new lichen bodies (thalli). It forms pale white to greyish crusts on tree bark and has been recorded in Australia and New Zealand, with scattered records in Europe and the Americas. When it produces fruiting bodies, they are bright red and stand out against the pale thallus. The species was formally described in 1982 from south-eastern Australia. Records now extend across Australasia and to scattered localities elsewhere, but it remains poorly documented in many regions.

== Taxonomy ==
Haematomma sorediatum was described as a new species by Roderick W. Rogers in 1982 in a revision of Australia's bark-dwelling Haematomma species. The description drew on earlier herbarium specimens collected near Lakes Entrance in south-eastern Victoria in the late 1880s. At the time of publication, no 20th-century collections were known. A later note reported a Tasmanian collection made in 1981. The holotype (the specimen that defines the name) is Francis Wilson's March 1889 collection from Lakes Entrance on the bark of Notelaea ovata and held at the National Herbarium of Victoria (specimen MEL 9169). It was separated from the similar H. leparioides by its chemistry: H. sorediatum contains atranorin and placodiolic acid, whereas H. leparioides was reported to contain atranorin only.

Rogers and John Bartlett reported the species from New Zealand in 1986, during a revision of New Zealand Haematomma collections. In that treatment it was distinguished from other Australasian species by its small, round (orbicular) soralia. Later work has discussed how broadly the name should be applied among similar sorediate taxa. H. neglectum has sometimes been treated as a synonym of H. sorediatum, but this remains uncertain because some material identified under that name has been reported to differ in its soralia and chemistry.

== Description ==
Haematomma sorediatum forms a pale white to grey (sometimes greenish-grey), crust-like thallus (the lichen body) with a granular to slightly warty (verruculose) surface. It reproduces asexually by producing soredia in discrete, round soralia that are usually raised into small domes; in older thalli, neighbouring soralia may merge. A thin, white, fibrous prothallus (a border at the thallus edge) may be present.

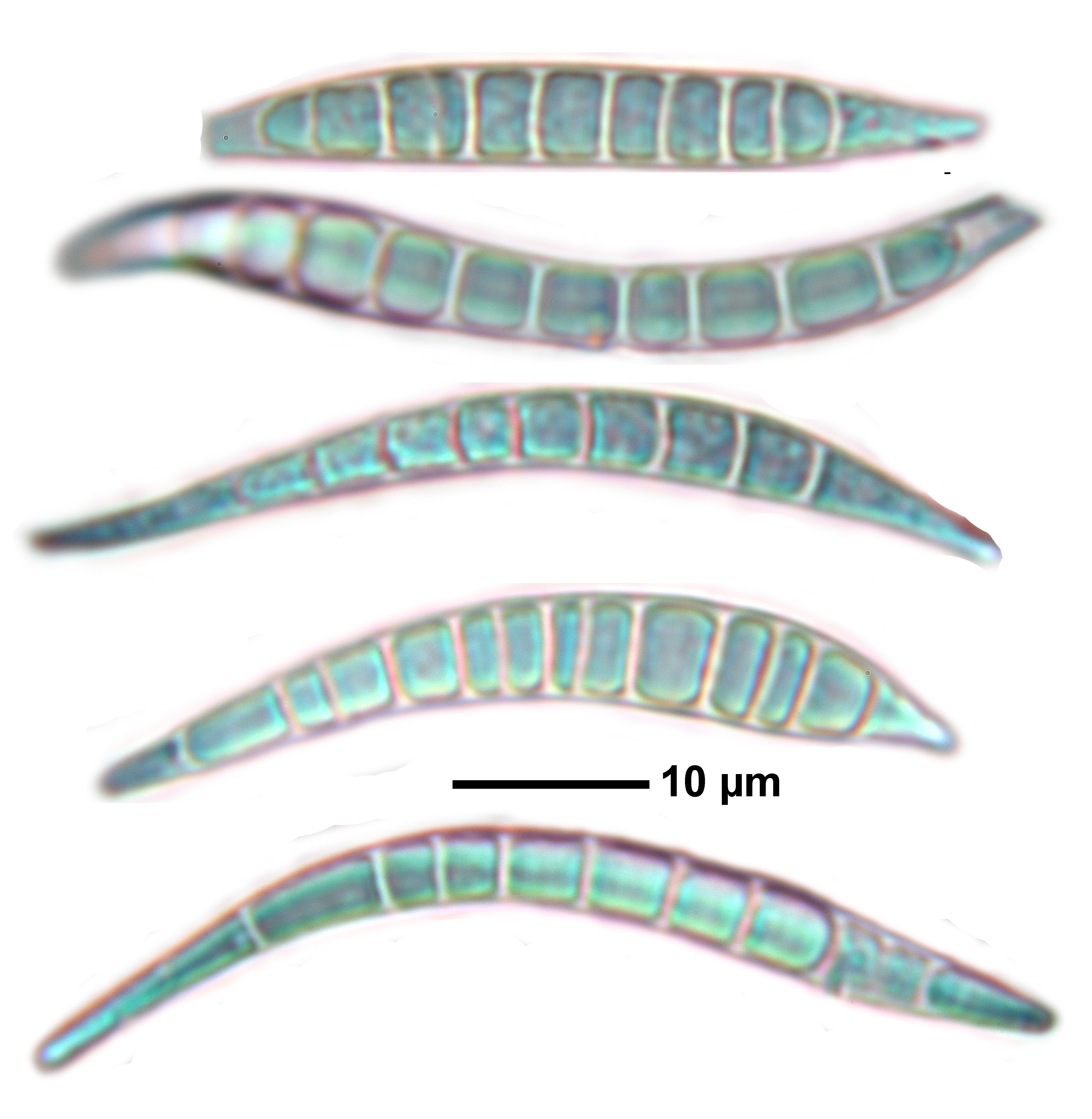
H. sorediatum produces spindle-shaped (fusiform) ascospores with multiple septa.

Apothecia (fruiting bodies), when present, are lecanorine in form and usually about 0.6–1 mm in diameter (occasionally larger). They have a bright red to orange-red disc and a persistent margin that is often crenulate (scalloped) and may become partly sorediate. The disc is often epruinose (lacking a powdery coating), though some collections have been described as having a light pruina. Asci contain eight colourless (hyaline) ascospores. Across published accounts, the spores are long and narrow (about 40–70 × 4–7 μm) and divided by about 7–14 transverse septa (cross walls). They have also been described as helically coiled within the ascus. Reported chemistry includes atranorin and placodiolic acid. In the K spot test (potassium hydroxide), the thallus typically turns yellow (K+), and the apothecial pigment briefly turns purple before fading.

== Habitat and distribution ==
Haematomma sorediatum is a bark-dwelling species with a distribution that has been described as widely pantropical (recorded across tropical regions). In the Asia–Pacific region it is known from Australia, New Zealand, and New Guinea. In Australia it is documented from south-eastern Victoria, including the type locality, where it has been collected on Notelaea ovata and Pomaderris apetala. It was later reported from Maria Island National Park (Tasmania), based on a March 1981 collection at about 300 m altitude. The specimen grew on the trunk of P. apetala in a humid creekline forest with Eucalyptus viminalis and Acacia melanoxylon. The species may be overlooked and may occur more widely where this host is present in eucalypt forests. It was later recorded from Stony Head in northern Tasmania. In New Zealand, it has been reported as common in the northern North Island (north of about 38°S). A separate (disjunct) record is also known from near Puponga in the north-west of the South Island, on the bark of several woody hosts including Rhopalostylis, Phyllocladus, and tawa. It has also been recorded from New Guinea, in primary (old-growth) mountain forest at 2300 m elevation.

In the Americas, H. sorediatum has been reported from the West Indies and has been confirmed from Jamaica. Reports from Cuba have been treated with caution because re-examined material identified under that name has been referred to other species. It has also been reported from Costa Rica, from central Chile (the Maule Region) on bark, and from Mount Roraima in the Guiana Shield (Venezuela–Guyana–Brazil).

In Europe, it has been recorded from Madeira (Portugal) and from France. In Britain and Ireland it is considered very rare, with records from Killarney, Ireland, and a possible report from Cornwall, England.
