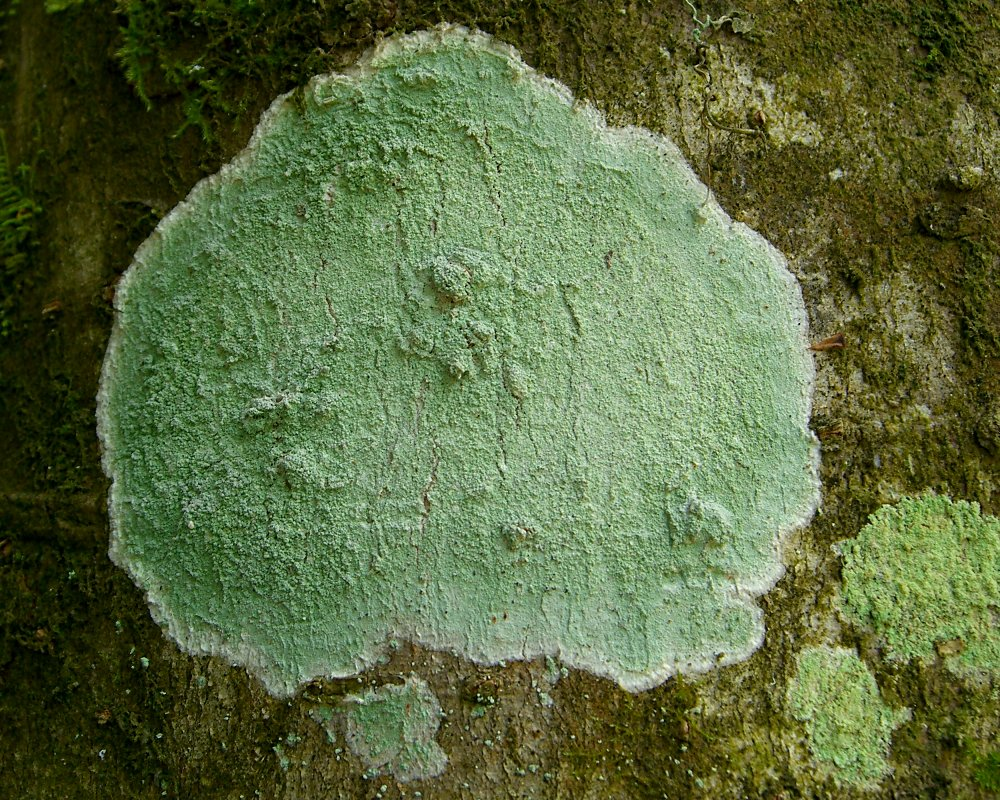
- The "mapledust lichen", Verseghya thysanophora

Scientific classification
- Domain: Eukaryota
- Kingdom: Fungi
- Division: Ascomycota
- Class: Lecanoromycetes
- Order: Pertusariales
- Family: Pertusariaceae
- Genus: Verseghya; S.Y.Kondr., Lőkös & Hur (2016)

Type species
- Verseghya klarae S.Y.Kondr., Lőkös & Hur (2016)

Species
- V. klarae; V. thysanophora

= Verseghya =

Genus of lichens

Verseghya is a small genus of lichen-forming fungi in the family Pertusariaceae. It has two species. The genus was established in 2016 and named after the Hungarian lichenologist Klára Verseghy for her contributions to lichen science. These rock-dwelling lichens form thin grey to greenish crusts that start as scattered granules before developing into smooth continuous sheets, sometimes with small bumps or wart-like formations.

== Taxonomy ==
The genus was circumscribed in 2016 by lichenologists Sergey Kondratyuk, Laszlo Lőkös, and Jae-Seoun Hur, with Verseghya klarae assigned as the type species. Both the genus name and species epithet of the type honour Hungarian lichenologist Klára Verseghy (1930–2020), who, according to the authors, "has made important contributions to our knowledge on species diversity of the genus Ochrolechia".

Molecular phylogenetic analysis showed that Verseghya klarae occupied a separate phylogenetic branch in the Pertusariaceae, situated between the genera Ochrolechia and Pertusaria and the Lecanora subcarnea species complex. Verseghya thysanophora was transferred to the genus (from Lecanora) in 2019.

== Description ==
Verseghya lichens begin as a barely visible film of scattered granules that soon coalesce into a smooth, continuous crust (thallus) hugging the rock surface. Around the margin the thallus remains paper-thin, but towards the centre it thickens and develops gentle undulations or wart-like bumps, sometimes breaking into pseudo-areoles (small cracked islands). Unlike many related genera the surface lacks a protective outer skin or cortex (it is ecorticate) and never produces powdery soredia for vegetative spread (esorediate). Colours range from grey to greenish, bluish, or whitish grey. A white, cobweb-like hypothallus often extends beyond the main body and may be interrupted by faint blackish rings. Sexual fruit-bodies (apothecia) are usually sparse and extremely variable in shape. Each has a thallus-derived rim (lecanorine margin) that becomes irregularly wavy, enclosing a pale brown to dull pinkish-brown disc that is initially concave, later flattening out and often dusted with a fine white bloom (pruina).

In section the apothecial rim shows a dark cortical layer that lightens when treated with potassium hydroxide solution, while the true exciple beneath is thin and almost indistinct. The spore-bearing tissue (hymenium) contains loosely arranged, gel-sheathed paraphyses and club-shaped asci of the Pertusaria type, each normally with eight ascospores but frequently found empty or with collapsed spores. The ascospores are large for the family, hyaline, ellipsoid, and usually divided into unequal cells by one or two septa; they may house a single large oil droplet and have walls up to 1 μm thick. Asexual reproduction occurs in immersed pycnidia that release long, thread-like (filiform) curved conidia. Chemically the genus is characterised by usnic acid, which lends a yellow-green tinge, and zeorine, both detectable by thin-layer chromatography.

== Habitat and distribution ==
The type species, V. klarae, is found in South Korea, where it grows on the bark of a wide variety of both deciduous and coniferous trees. Verseghya thysanophora is widely distributed in the Northern Hemisphere.

== Species interactions ==
Nectriopsis verseghyae-klarae is a lichenicolous fungus that parasitises Verseghya klarae.

== Species ==
- Verseghya klarae S.Y.Kondr., Lőkös & Hur (2016) – South Korea
- Verseghya thysanophora (R.C.Harris) S.Y.Kondr., Lőkös, Farkas & Hur (2019) – widespread in Northern Hemisphere
