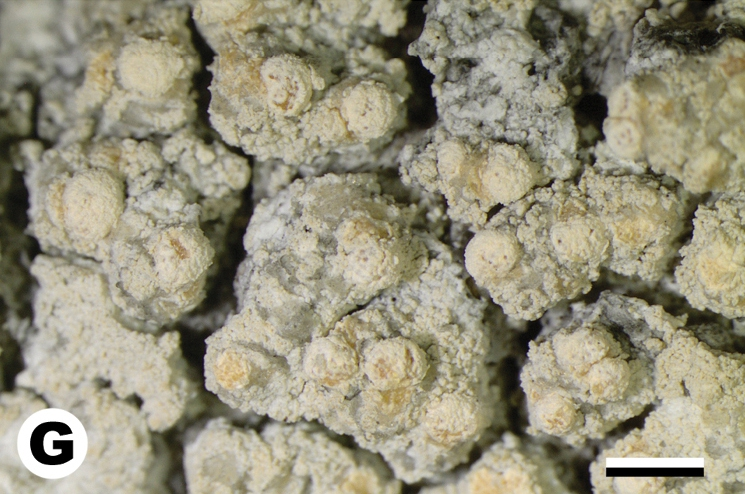
- Varicellaria rhodocarpa

Scientific classification
- Kingdom: Fungi
- Division: Ascomycota
- Class: Lecanoromycetes
- Order: Pertusariales
- Family: Varicellariaceae; B.P.Hodk., R.C.Harris & Lendemer ex Lumbsch & Leavitt (2018)
- Genus: Varicellaria; Nyl. (1858)

Type species
- Varicellaria microsticta Nyl. (1858)

Synonyms
- Varicellariomyces Cif. & Tomas. (1953); Clausaria Nyl. (1861)

= Varicellaria =

Genus of lichen

Varicellaria is a genus of crustose lichens. It is the only genus in the family Varicellariaceae. The genus contains 12 recognized species found worldwide. These lichens typically form pale bluish-grey or whitish-grey crusts on tree bark or rocks, and they produce a lichen product called lecanoric acid. Genetic studies have helped clarify the boundaries between species in this group, showing that where they grow (bark versus rock) and certain physical features are important for telling them apart.

== Taxonomy ==
The genus Varicellaria was circumscribed by Finnish lichenologist William Nylander in 1858, with Varicellaria microsticta assigned as the type species. Nylander's type species V. microsticta is treated as the same species as V. rhodocarpa in Schmitt and colleagues 2012 re-circumscription; Nylander's later segregate Clausaria (type 'Clausaria fallens' ≡ V. velata) is placed in synonymy with Varicellaria.

A multilocus phylogeny sampling lecanoric acid Pertusaria/Varicellaria species recovered a strongly supported Varicellaria clade that is distant from Pertusaria in the strict sense. On this basis the genus was re-circumscribed to include species with disc-like apothecia, a non-amyloid hymenial gel, strongly amyloid asci with 1–2 spores, and 1- or 2-celled thick-walled ascospores; all species produce lecanoric acid and may also contain lichexanthone or variolaric acid. The 2012 treatment accepted seven species and effected the new combinations V. culbersonii, V. hemisphaerica, V. kasandjeffii, V. lactea, V. philippina, with V. rhodocarpa and V. velata also placed in the genus; two names (kasandjeffii, philippina) were included on morphology/chemistry due to lack of fresh material.

The family Varicellariaceae, containing only the type genus Varicellaria, was informally proposed by Brendan Hodkinson, Richard Harris, and James Lendemer in 2011. H. Thorsten Lumbsch and Steven Leavitt formally published the family in 2018. However, the taxon was not validly published because "an identifier issued by a recognized repository was not cited in the protologue", contrary to rules of botanical nomenclature. This nomenclatural oversight was rectified later the same year in a separate publication.

== Description ==
Characteristics of the family Varicellariaceae are similar to those of its genus. These are: a crustose thallus, unicellular green algal photobionts from genus Trebouxia, ascomata in the form of disc-like apothecia, non-amyloid gel in the hymenium, strongly amyloid, one- or two-spored asci, and hyaline, thick-walled, one-layered, one- or two-celled ascospores.

Varicellaria species are characterised by a pale bluish-grey or whitish grey thallus, which can be smooth and thin or cracked and thick. They typically have convex soralia that are paler or the same colour as the thallus. Apothecia (fruiting bodies) are rare in these species.

Varicellaria species are associated with green algae from the genus Trebouxia. Specifically, they have been found to associate with Trebouxia sp. OTU A03.

The major secondary metabolite in Varicellaria species is lecanoric acid. Some specimens may also contain variolaric acid, but its presence is not a reliable diagnostic feature for species identification. Some contain lichexanthone.

== Habitat and distribution ==
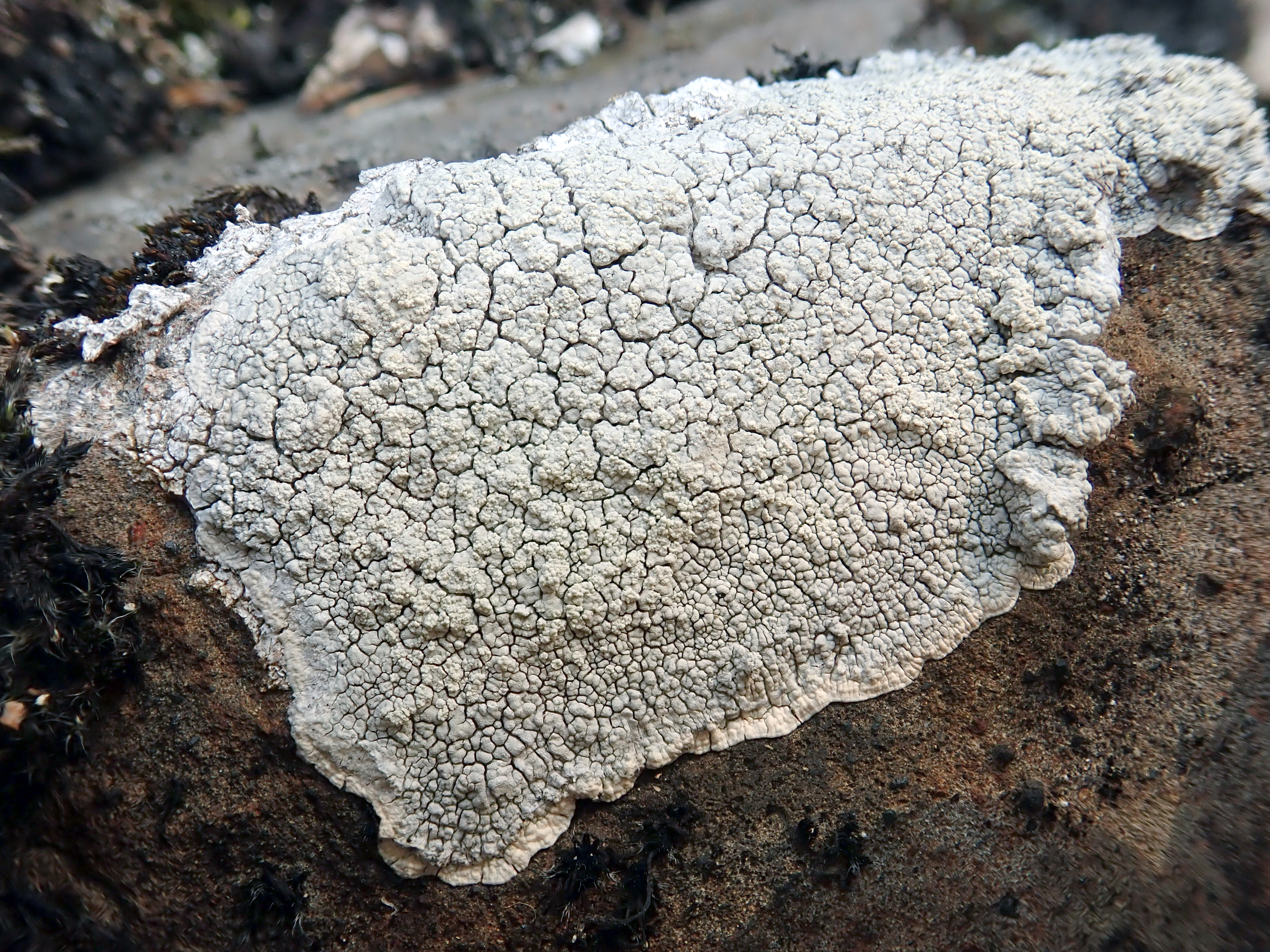
Varicellaria lactea

Collectively, the species in genus Varicellaria have a cosmopolitan distribution. Varicellaria species show diverse substrate preferences. Some species, like V. hemisphaerica, are primarily corticolous (growing on bark), while others, such as V. lactea, are saxicolous (growing on rocks). These habitat preferences play a role in species delimitation. Within this broad pattern, species show distinct ranges and substrates: V. rhodocarpa occurs on soil, detritus or mosses in arctic–alpine habitats of the Northern Hemisphere; V. velata is cosmopolitan; V. philippina is so far confirmed only from the Philippines and Papua New Guinea; V. kasandjeffii is restricted to siliceous rock in the Balkan region; and V. culbersonii occurs on soil, detritus or mosses at high elevations in Central America. Consistent with recent work, V. hemisphaerica is mainly corticolous (rarely on rock) whereas V. lactea is mainly saxicolous (rarely on bark); substrate shift between bark and rock is a likely axis of divergence within this pair.

== Species ==
Recent molecular phylogenetics studies have helped clarify species boundaries within Varicellaria. These studies have shown that substrate preference and soredia size are important factors in distinguishing between species. Molecular data, combined with morphological and chemical characteristics, have proven essential for accurate species identification.

As of 2024, there are 12 recognised species in the genus Varicellaria:

- Varicellaria culbersonii (Vězda) I.Schmitt & Lumbsch (2012)
- Varicellaria emeiensis Q.Ren (2018) – China
- Varicellaria hemisphaerica (Flörke) I.Schmitt & Lumbsch (2012)
- Varicellaria kasandjeffii (Szatala) I.Schmitt & Lumbsch (2012)
- Varicellaria lactea (L.) I.Schmitt & Lumbsch (2012)
- Varicellaria microsticta Nyl. (1858)
- Varicellaria philippina (Vain.) I.Schmitt & Lumbsch (2012)
- Varicellaria rhodocarpa (Körb.) Th.Fr. (1871)
- Varicellaria velata (Turner) I.Schmitt & Lumbsch (2012)
- Varicellaria cacuminuminum Fryday (2022)
