= Haematomma staigeriae =

Scientific classification
- Kingdom: Fungi
- Division: Ascomycota
- Class: Lecanoromycetes
- Order: Lecanorales
- Family: Haematommataceae
- Genus: Haematomma
- Species: H. staigeriae

Binomial name
- Haematomma staigeriae Nelsen, Lücking & L.Umaña (2006)

Species of lichen-forming fungus

Haematomma staigeriae is a species of corticolous (bark-dwelling) lichen in the family Haematommataceae. Found in Costa Rica, it was formally described as a new species in 2006 by Matthew Nelsen, Robert Lücking, and Loengrin Umaña. The type specimen was collected by the second author from the Talamanca Ridge in the Pacific La Amistad Conservation Area (Puntarenas) at an elevation between 1,600 and 1,800 m (5,200 and 5,900 ft). Here, in a montane rainforest area with secondary vegetation dominated by Cecropia, the species was found growing on the lower trunks of trees. It is only known from the type locality. The specific epithet honours the German lichenologist Bettina Staiger "for her contribution to the taxonomy and understanding of this genus".

The lichen has a greyish to pale yellowish white thallus with a verrucose (warted) surface texture that measures 3 to 5 cm (1 to 2 in) across. Soralia are rounded with a mealy surface, measuring up to 2 mm in diameter. Ascospores number four to eight per ascus, and are narrowly fusiform (spindle-shaped) with between 11 and 23 transverse septa and 0 or 1 longitudinal septa, and have dimensions of 50–90 by 6–10 μm. Lichen products found in Haematomma staigeriae include russulone and lichexanthone.
