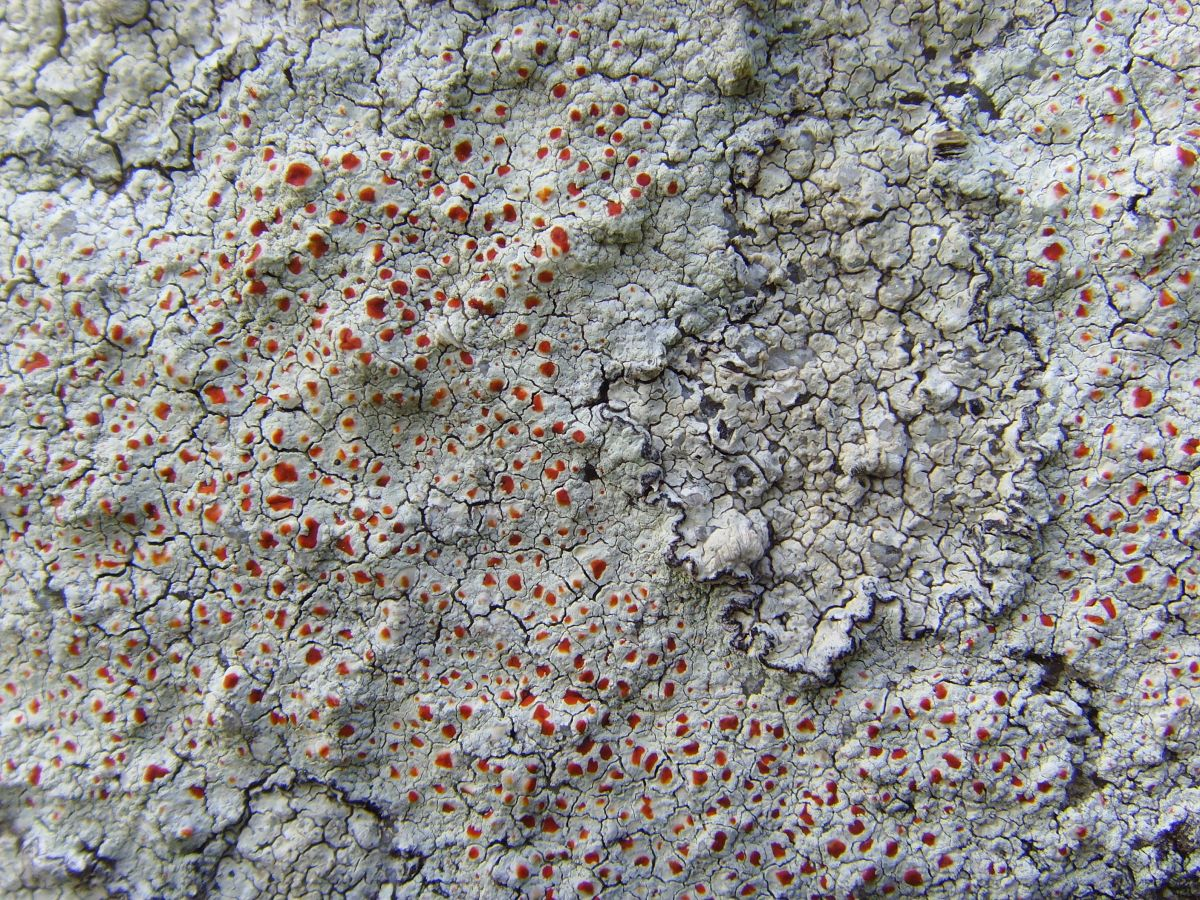

Conservation status
- Secure (NatureServe)

Scientific classification
- Kingdom: Fungi
- Division: Ascomycota
- Class: Lecanoromycetes
- Order: Lecanorales
- Family: Haematommataceae
- Genus: Haematomma
- Species: H. ochroleucum

Binomial name
- Haematomma ochroleucum (Neck.) Laundon, 1970

Synonyms
- Lichen ochroleucus Neck., 1771; Lichen haematomma Ehrh., 1783; Lichen coccineus Dicks., 1785; Lepraria leiphaema Ach., 1803; Lecidea callosyne Ach., 1808; Haematomma coccineum Körb., 1855; Haematomma leiphaemum Zopf, 1907

= Haematomma ochroleucum =

Species of lichen

Haematomma ochroleucum, also known as yellow bloodstain lichen, is a species of crustose lichenized fungus. First described in 1771 by Noël Martin Joseph de Necker, it has no subspecies, but two named varieties: H. o. var. ochroleucum and H. o. var. porphyrium.

== Taxonomy ==
Belgian botanist Noël Martin Joseph de Necker first described Haematomma ochroleucum in 1771 from a type specimen collected from shaded rocks in the Rheinland-Pfalz region of Germany. He named it Lichen ochroleucus. When Jack Laundon moved the species to the genus Haematomma in 1970, he created the combination Haematomma ochroleucum to replace the illegitimately named Haematomma coccineum. The latter name had been given to a later description of the same species, and had gained widespread usage; however, Necker's name took taxonomic precedence. Haematomma ochroleucum is the type species for the genus Haematomma. It has no subspecies, but it does have two named varieties: H. o. var. ochroleucum and H. o. var. porphyrium, which differ in color and chemical composition.

The genus name Haematomma means "bloody eye", and is a reference to the red color of the lichen's apothecia. The specific epithet ochroleucum is a combination of the Latin word oclira, meaning "ochre", and the Greek word leucum, meaning "white"; the combination indicates a pale ochre color. The species is known colloquially as yellow bloodstain lichen.

== Description ==
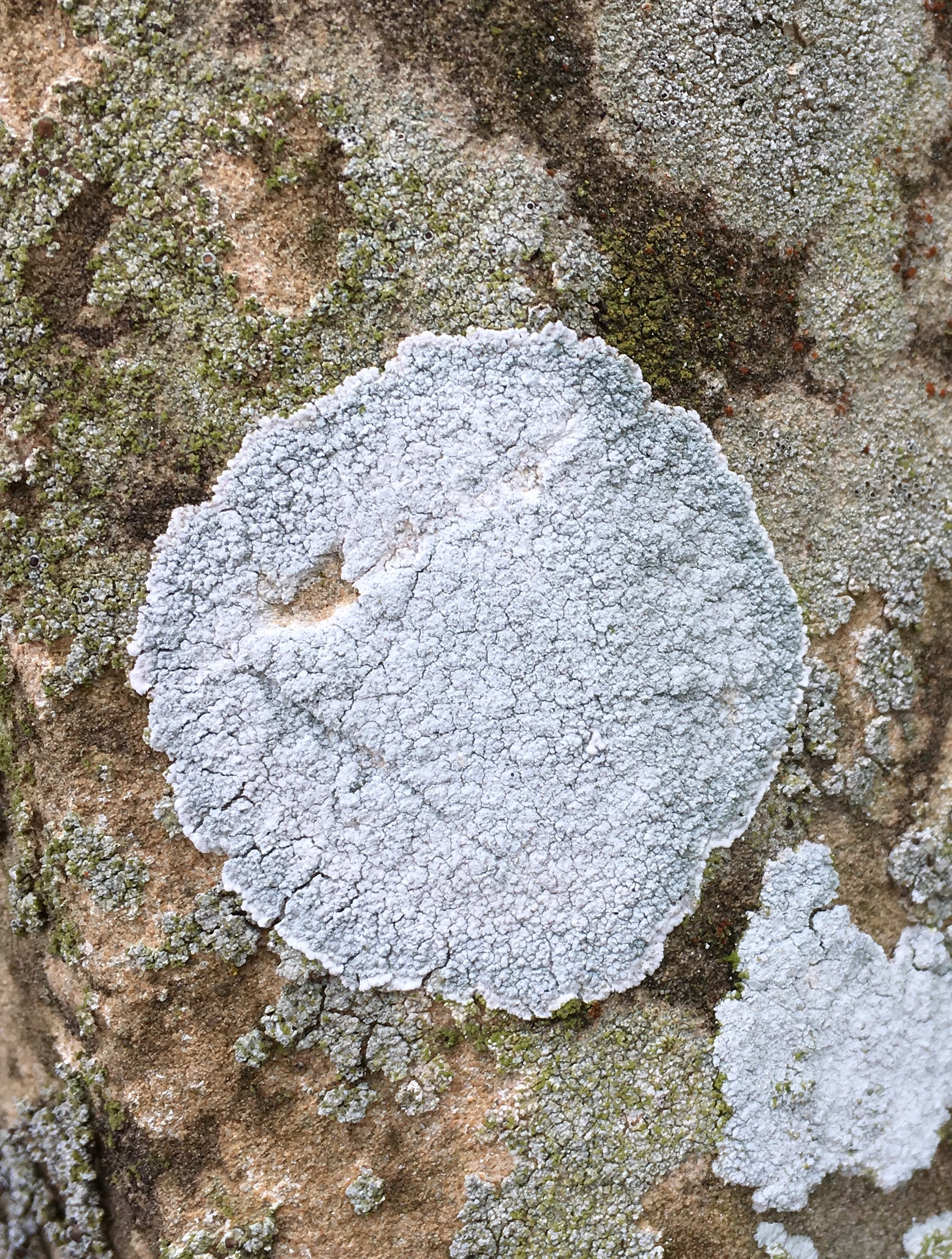

Haematomma ochroleucum is a crustose lichen. It comes in two color forms: the thallus of H. o. ochroleucum is pale yellow to yellow-green, while that of H. o. porphyrium is whitish to pale gray. Colonies of both varieties are edged with a fringed white prothallus. Its photobiont is a chlorococcoid.

The lichen's thallus reacts positively with both potassium hydroxide (K) and para-phenylenediamene (Pd), turning yellow in both cases. Its apothecia react positively with potassium as well, turning purple. Among the substances produced by the lichen are atranorin, zeorin, and porphyrillic acid. The variety ochroleucum also produces usnic acid, which the variety porphyrium does not. The apothecia and pycnidia produce anthraquinones.

=== Similar species ===
Haematomma ochroleucum var. ochroleucum can look very similar to Lecanora thysanophora, but the former species has a shorter, more continuous prothallus which is more uniformly white with thinner hyphae. The two species share similar chemistry, though Lecanora thysanophora nearly always contains thysanophora unknowns that are not known to occur in Haematomma ochroleucum.

== Distribution and habitat ==
In Europe, Haematomma ochroleucum has been reported as widespread, though its relative abundance varies widely. In parts of Ireland and Wales, it is rare but locally abundant on shaded rocky outcrops, particularly those that are north-facing. In Wales, it is more common inland than at the coast. In Belgium and Luxembourg, it is found primarily on protected, vertical surfaces on siliceous or sandstone rocks, or on the bark of older beech or oak trees in well-preserved forests. It is less common on the trunks of poplars and willows. In North America, it is rare, and limited primarily to the Pacific Northwest and southern Rocky Mountains. There, it is found primarily in waterfall spray zones, with fewer colonies on drier vertical rock faces, rocky overhangs, and the trunks of large black cottonwood trees. It has also been found in Maine.

== Ecology ==
Haematomma ochroleucum cannot tolerate significant amounts of sulfur dioxide pollution; it is found only if the mean winter concentrations are less than about 60 μg/m^{3}. In Ireland, it grows in communities that include Lobaria virens, Nephroma laevigatum, Opegrapha gyrocarpa, Dermatocarpon luridum and Toninia pulvinata. On the Danish island of Bornholm (in the Baltic Sea), it occurs on vertical rock faces above 10 m (33 ft) high, in association with Ramalina siliquosa, Lecanora atra, and Rhizocarpon constrictum.
