= Johannes Hillmann =

German German botanist and lichenologist (1881–1943)

Johannes Hillmann (1881–1943) was a German teacher, botanist, and lichenologist.

Hillman was born in Berlin in 1881. He became a teacher after studying natural sciences at the University of Berlin. Hillmann researched lichens from the period 1916 to 1943, contributing 36 publications on the subject. He is perhaps best known for his contributions to the families Parmeliaceae and Teloschistaceae, which were published in Gottlob Ludwig Rabenhorst's influential work Dr. L. Rabenhorst's Kryptogamen-Flora von Deutschland, Oesterreich und der Schweiz. Hillman retired from teaching in 1939, and died in Berlin in 1943. His herbarium of specimens, located in Buckow, was destroyed during World War II.

Four lichen species named after Hillman are Buellia hillmanii Erichsen (1930), Lecidea hillmannii Anders (1922), Micropeltella hillmanniana Kirschst. (1936), and Propolis hillmanniana Kirschst. (1935).

== Selected works ==
- Hillmann, J. (1935). "Teloschistaceae". Dr. L. Rabenhorst's Krytogamen-Flora von Deutschland, Österreich und der Schweiz (in German). Vol. 9. Leipzig: Akademische Verlagsgesellschaft. pp. 1–36.
- Hillmann, J. (1936). "Parmeliaceae". Dr. L. Rabenhorst's Kryptogamen-Flora von Deutschland, Österreich und der Schweiz (in German). Vol. 9. Leipzig: Akademische Verlagsgesellschaft. pp. 1–309.
- Hillmann, J.; Grummann, V. (1957). Kryptogamenflora der Mark Brandenburg und angrenzender Gebiete. Band VIII: Flechten (in German). Berlin: Nikolassee: Gebrüder Borntraeger. pp. 1–898.

== See also ==
- Category:Taxa named by Johannes Hillmann
