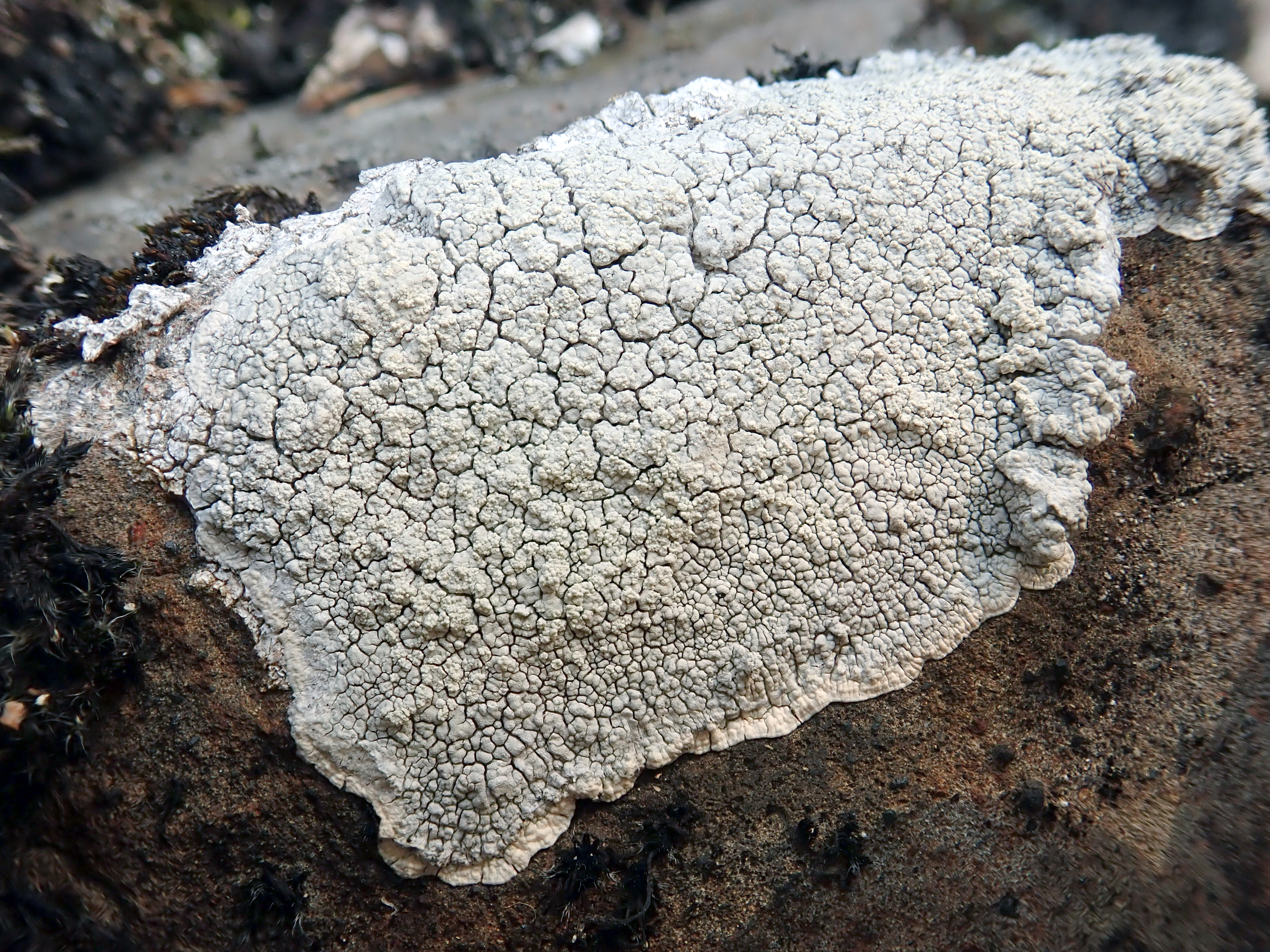

Scientific classification
- Kingdom: Fungi
- Division: Ascomycota
- Class: Lecanoromycetes
- Order: Pertusariales
- Family: Varicellariaceae
- Genus: Varicellaria
- Species: V. lactea

Binomial name
- Varicellaria lactea (L.) I.Schmitt & Lumbsch (2012)

Synonyms
- List: Lichen lacteus L. (1767); Lepra lactea (L.) F.H.Wigg. (1780); Variolaria lactea (L.) Pers. (1794); Psora lactea (L.) P.Gaertn. (1802); Pertusaria communis var. lactea (L.) Rabenh. (1840); Parmelia sordida f. lactea (L.) Torss. (1843); Lecanora rimosa f. lactea (L.) Schaer. (1850); Zeora stenhammarii * lactea (L.) Körb. (1855); Pertusaria lactescens b lactea (L.) Mudd (1861); Zeora rimosa f. lactea (L.) Kremp. (1861); Zeora lactea (L.) Arnold (1870); Pertusaria lactea (L.) Arnold (1872); Pertusaria lutescens var. lactea (L.) Zahlbr. (1927); Ochrolechia lactea (L.) Matzer & Hafellner (1990); Lichen lacteus Sibth. (1794); Lepra lactea DC. (1805); Parmelia tartarea var. lactea Torss. (1843); Lecanora pallescens f. lactea (Torss.) Schaer. (1850); Lepraria lactea (Torss.) Hue (1892)

= Varicellaria lactea =

Species of lichen-forming fungus

Varicellaria lactea is a crustose lichen in the family Varicellariaceae. It forms a relatively thick, white to grey‑white, matt crust that breaks into small, tile‑like patches and carries scattered white, powdery soralia (patches that shed tiny propagules); sexual fruiting bodies are rare, and when present they produce a single very large spore, with the lichen containing lecanoric and variolaric acids. Ecologically it is chiefly rock‑dwelling on lime-free siliceous and volcanic rocks in humid, shaded situations, and is widespread in Europe with confirmed records from the Azores, South Korea, and Alaska. First described by Carl Linnaeus in 1767 as Lichen lacteus, the name was fixed by a neotype designated in 1994 and the species was transferred to Varicellaria in 2012 following a multi‑gene revision that separated the genus from Pertusaria in the strict sense. It is usually distinguished from the related V. hemisphaerica by its rock substrate and the presence of variolaric acid, whereas V. hemisphaerica is mainly bark‑dwelling and lacks that compound.

== Taxonomy ==
The lichen was formally described as a new species by Carl Linnaeus in his 1767 work Mantissa plantarum. In the protologue Linnaeus characterised it as a white, leprous lichen with hemispherical, same-coloured tubercles. He recorded the habitat as "everywhere on cliffs and stones", credited to Johan Zoëga, and added that the tubercles are "rather large".

No original Linnaean material is preserved in the Linnaean Herbarium. To stabilise usage of the name, Per Magnus Jørgensen and colleagues designated a neotype. Imke Schmitt and H. Thorsten Lumbsch give its full citation—Sweden, Västergötland, Mularp, 6 Aug 1922, Vrang [= Malme, Lich. Suec. Exs. 848] (UPS)—which fixes the modern application of the name. In the same 2012 treatment recasting Pertusaria and relatives, Schmitt and Lumbsch effected the new combination Varicellaria lactea (basionym Lichen lacteus) and listed earlier placements under Lepra, Variolaria, Psora, Zeora, Pertusaria, and Ochrolechia.

Their multi-gene analysis showed that the lecanoric acid, disc-apotheciate "Varicellaria group" forms a distinct, well-supported clade separate from Pertusaria in the strict sense, and they therefore broadened the circumscription of Varicellaria. The key separates V. lactea from the bark-dwelling V. hemisphaerica chiefly by substrate and chemistry: V. lactea is sorediate on rock, usually with lecanoric and variolaric acids (rarely on bark), whereas V. hemisphaerica is on bark (rarely on rock) with lecanoric acid only.

== Description ==
Varicellaria lactea forms a spreading, relatively thick thallus (the main body of the lichen) that appears white to greyish-white. Around the edges, a paler border called the prothallus is often visible, sometimes showing faint concentric zoning. The upper surface is typically smooth to slightly roughened and has a dull, matt appearance. It usually breaks up into a regular pattern of small, tile-like pieces known as areoles, which in this species are fairly coarse, measuring about 0.3–0.8 mm across. These can be flat but are often noticeably convex and vary in shape from rounded to angular.

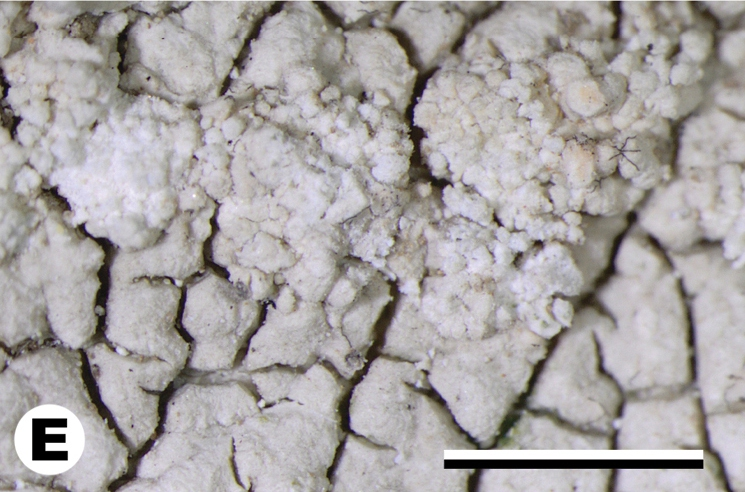
Close-up of the crustose thallus, showing cracked areoles with white soralia (scale bar = 1 mm)

The lichen reproduces mainly by means of soralia, which are small, powdery patches that produce dispersal granules called soredia. The soralia are white, slightly raised, and usually 0.5–1.5 mm in diameter; they may be surrounded by a fragile collar of thallus tissue and sometimes appear floury or efflorescent. They are mostly scattered evenly across the thallus but can occasionally grow close together. The soredia themselves are tiny, about 100–160 micrometres (μm) wide, although they can cluster into larger aggregations.

Sexual reproductive structures are very uncommon in this species. When present, they occur as wart-like swellings that resemble soralia but are a little wider (0.4–0.7 mm). Each of these swellings usually contains one disc-shaped apothecium, rarely two. The discs are pale brown and at first covered by a frosty coating of white granules; they are often surrounded by a ragged collar of thallus tissue that also produces soredia. Within these apothecia, the spore-bearing sacs (asci) contain only a single ascospore each. The spores are exceptionally large, measuring 180–240 μm long and 60–100 μm wide, with very thick walls (up to 33 μm), and lack the fine internal banding seen in some other lichens. The asexual conidia are much smaller, rod-shaped structures only about 4.5 μm long and 0.5 μm wide.

Chemical spot tests provide useful characters for identification: the thallus reacts red with C and KC reagents, shows no colour change with K or Pd, and may fluoresce faintly bluish-green under ultraviolet light. These reactions correspond to the presence of the secondary metabolites (lichen products) lecanoric acid and variolaric acid.

== Habitat and distribution ==
Varicellaria lactea is chiefly saxicolous (rock-dwelling), occurring on hard, lime-free, siliceous rocks in humid, shaded to semi‑shaded positions, often on steep faces; it is also recorded on volcanic substrates such as basalt. Field and phylogenetic work shows that the species is overwhelmingly rock‑dwelling, with the few reports from bark now understood to reflect confusion with the related corticolous V. hemisphaerica; substrate rather than chemistry is the main separator between the two.

The species is widespread across Europe and locally frequent from lowlands into montane belts, and it also occurs in Macaronesia (Azores) on basaltic rock. Beyond Europe, modern revisions confirm it from East Asia (South Korea) and from North America, where it was first documented for the United States in Alaska and has since been recorded in Alaskan national parks on overhanging and vertical rock walls.

== See also ==
- List of lichens named by Carl Linnaeus
