= Digalloylglucose =

Digalloylglucose may refer to:

- 1,6-Digalloylglucose, a gallotannin found in species of oak
- 2,6-Digalloylglucose and 3,6-digalloylglucose, gallotannins found in galls of Tamarix aphylla
