= C27H24O18 =

The molecular formula C_{27}H_{24}O_{18} (molar mass: 636.46 g/mol, exact mass: 636.0963 u) may refer to:

- 1,3,6-Trigalloyl glucose
- 1,2,6-Trigalloyl glucose
- 1,2,3-Trigalloyl glucose
