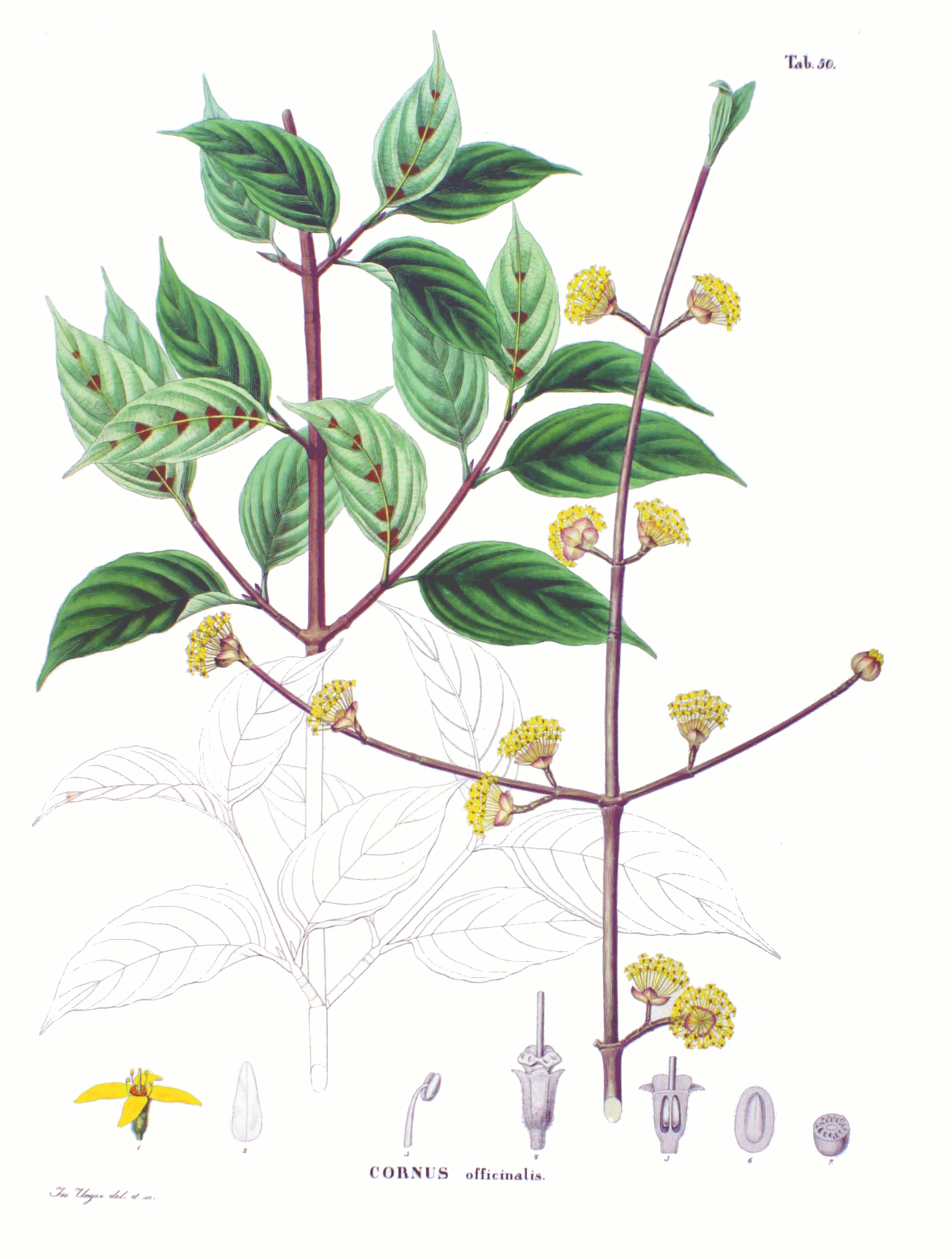

Scientific classification
- Kingdom: Plantae
- Clade: Tracheophytes
- Clade: Angiosperms
- Clade: Eudicots
- Clade: Asterids
- Order: Cornales
- Family: Cornaceae
- Genus: Cornus
- Subgenus: Cornus subg. Cornus
- Species: C. officinalis

Binomial name
- Cornus officinalis Torr. ex Dur.

= Cornus officinalis =

Species of flowering plant

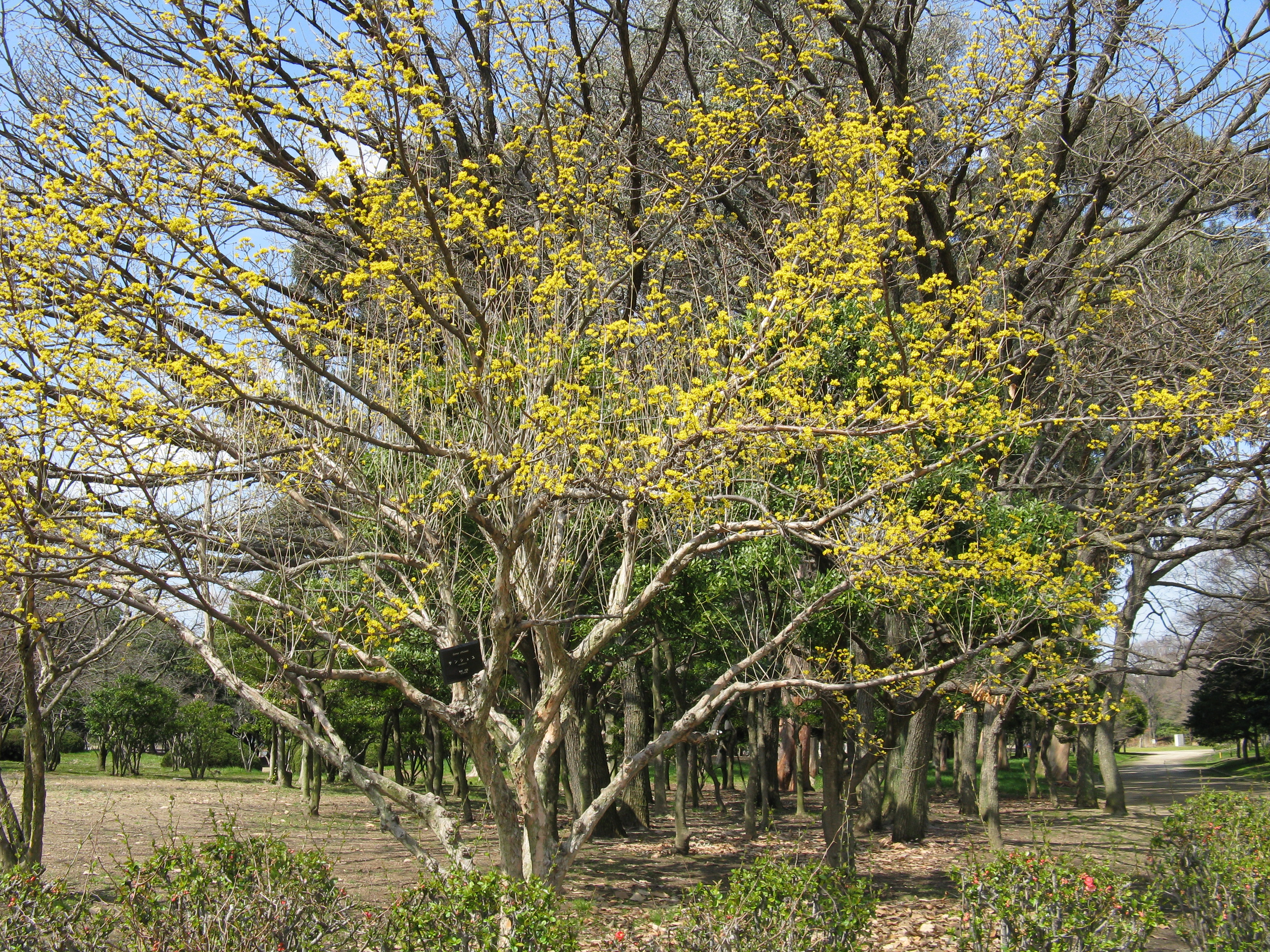

Cornus officinalis, the Japanese cornel or Japanese cornelian cherry, is a species of flowering plant in the dogwood family Cornaceae. Despite its name, it is native to China and Korea as well as Japan. It is not to be confused with C. mas, which is also known as the Cornelian cherry. It is not closely related to the true cherries of the genus Prunus.

== Description ==
It is a large, strongly-growing deciduous shrub with rough flaky bark. Umbels of acid yellow flowers appear in early spring before the oval leaves. The red berries, which are edible, appear later in the summer, and the leaves turn shades of red before falling in the autumn.

== Etymology ==
In Korean it is known as sansuyu (산수유), in Chinese as shānzhūyú (山茱萸) and in Japanese as sanshuyu (さんしゅゆ).

The Latin specific epithet officinalis refers to plants which have some medicinal or culinary use - in this case the edible berries.

== Cultivation ==
The plant is valued in cultivation for providing year-round interest in the garden. It is, however, quite a substantial shrub, typically growing to 8 m (26 ft) tall and broad. The cultivar 'Kintoki', with larger and more abundant flowers, has won the Royal Horticultural Society's Award of Garden Merit.

== Chemical constituents ==
The plant contains oleanolic acid and ursolic acid. Cell cultures of C. officinalis contain gallotannins in the forms of tri-, tetra- and pentagalloylglucoses. The main tannins are 1,2,3,6-tetragalloylglucose, 1,2,6-trigalloyl-glucose, 1,2,3,4,6-pentagalloyl-glucose and 6-digalloyl-1,2,3-trigalloyl-glucose.

== Gallery ==
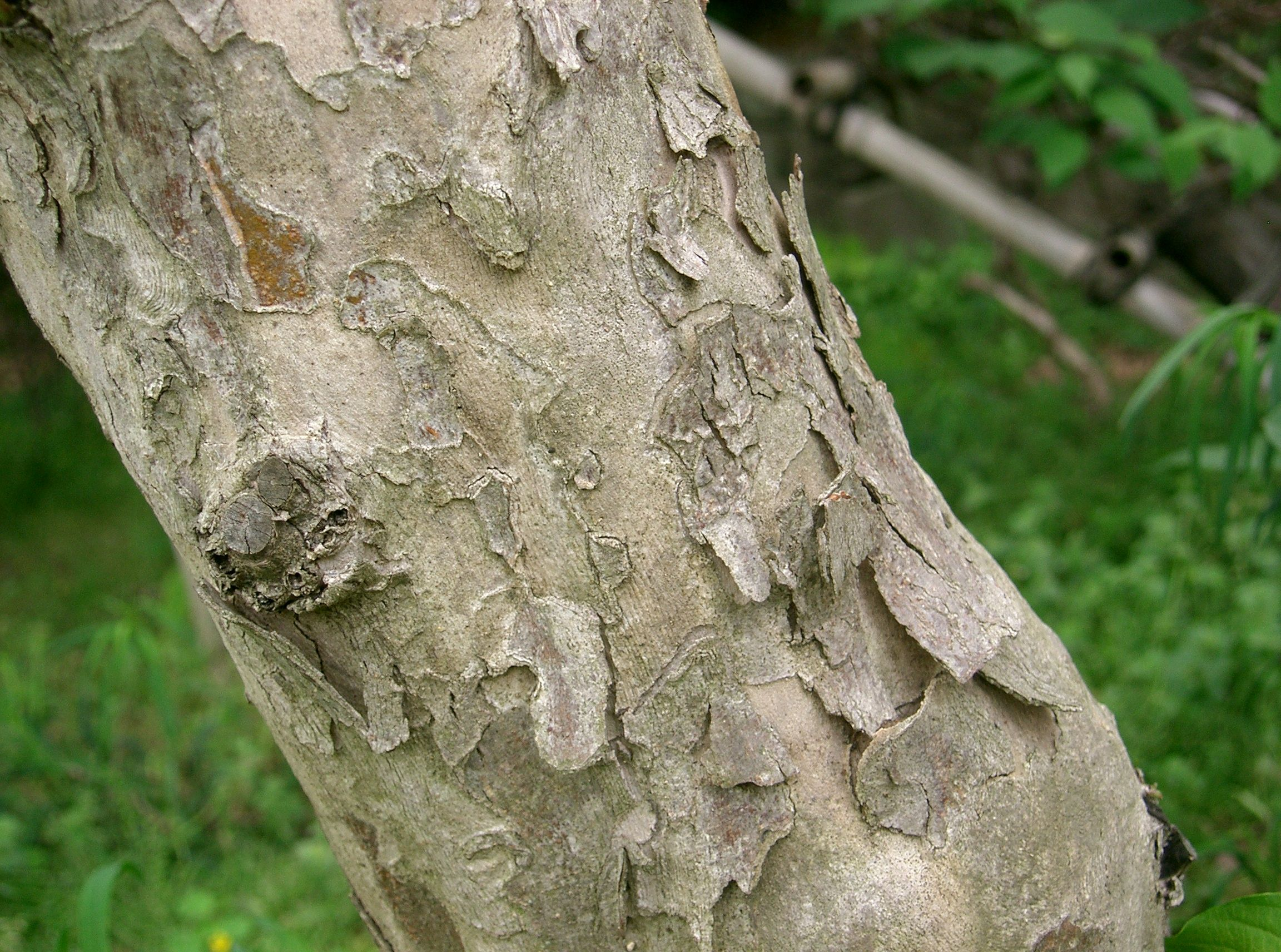
Trunk

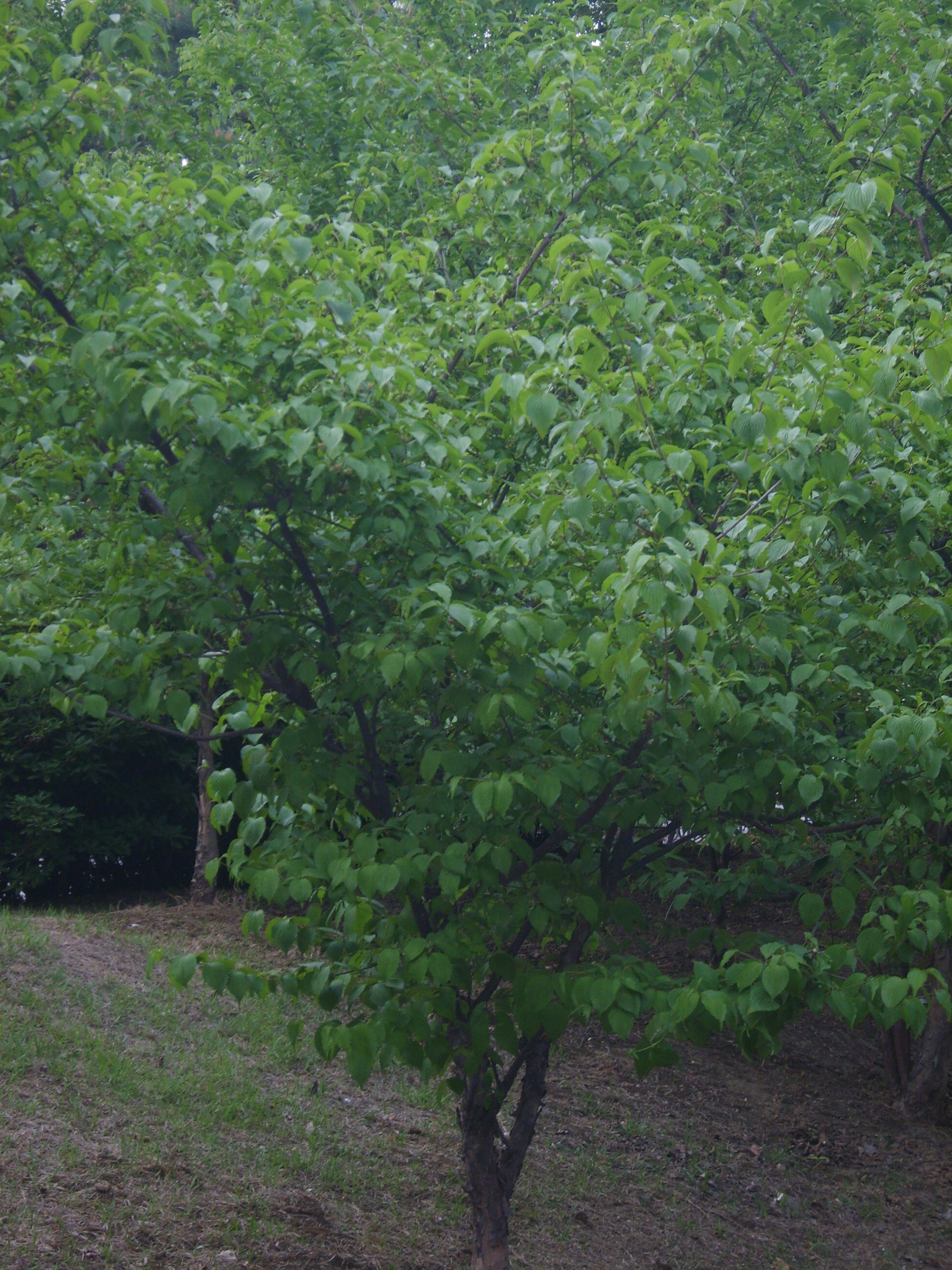
Bush

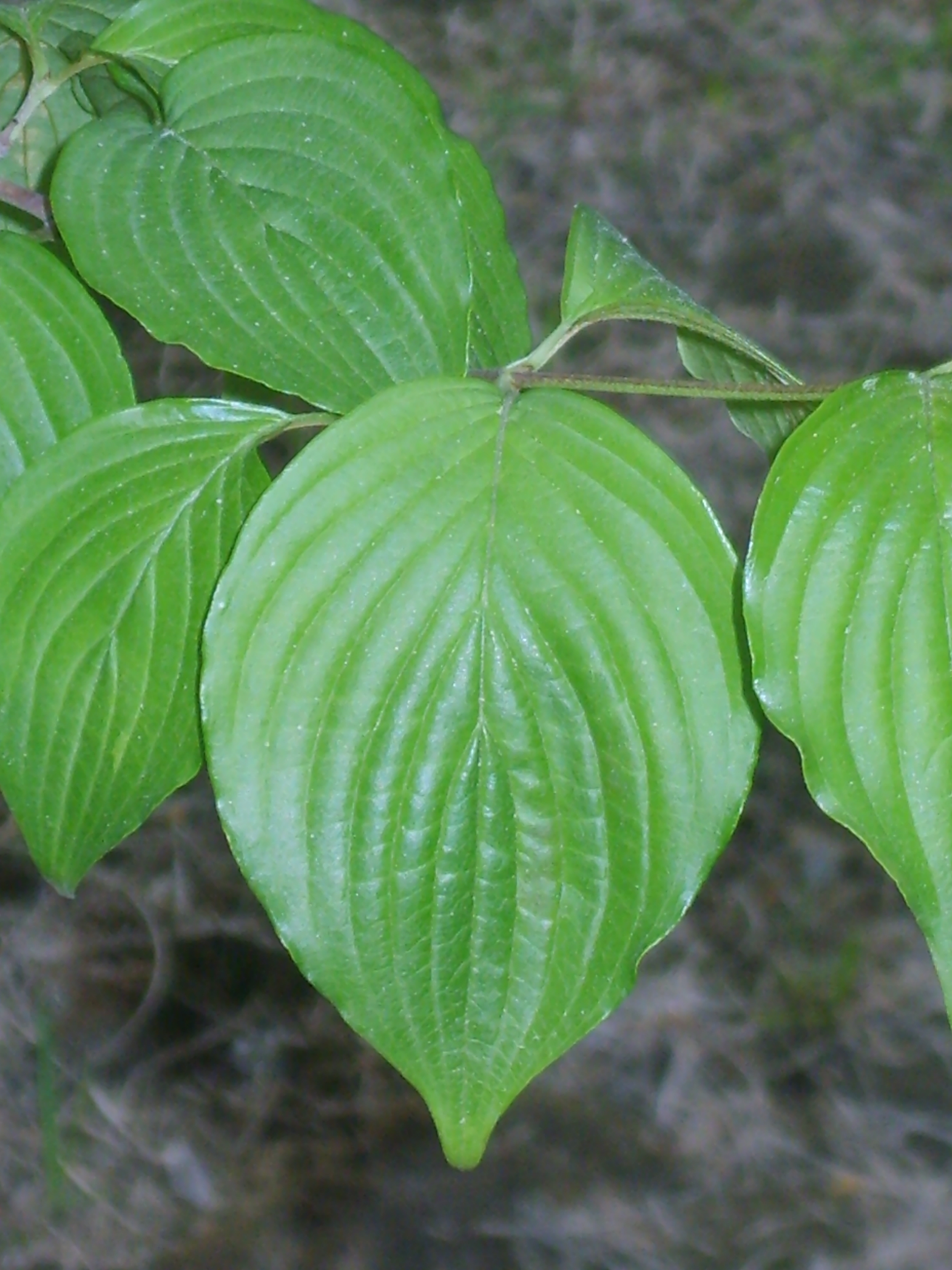
Leaves

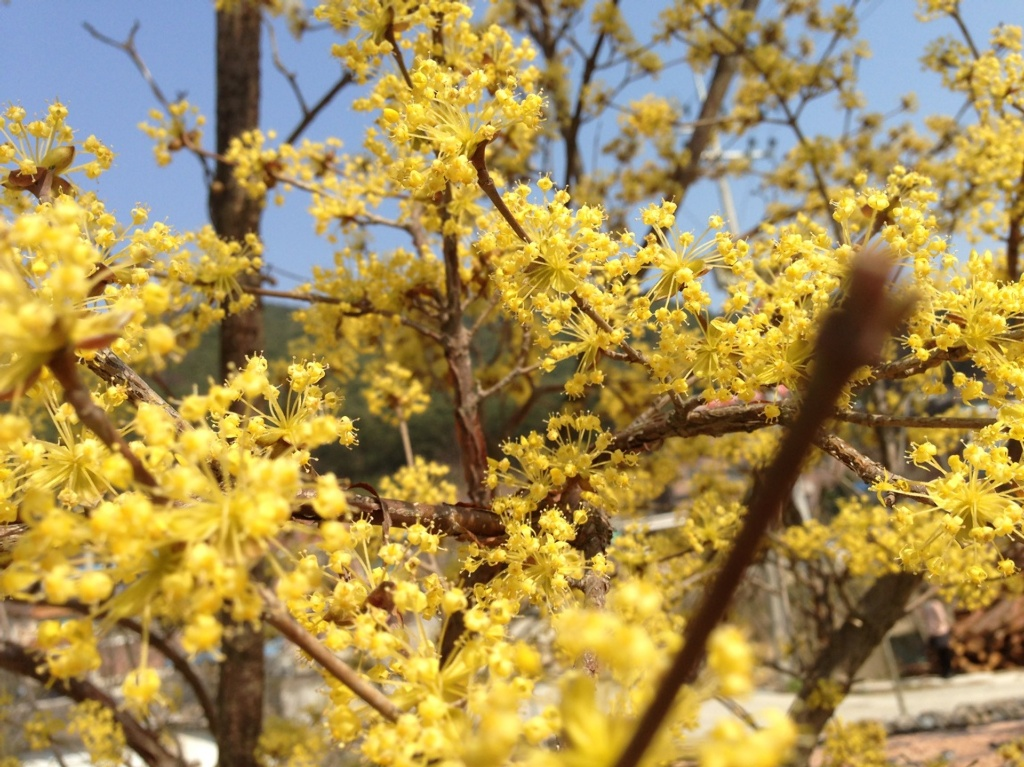
Flowers
