= Cryptothecia methylmicrophyllinica =

Scientific classification
- Domain: Eukaryota
- Kingdom: Fungi
- Division: Ascomycota
- Class: Arthoniomycetes
- Order: Arthoniales
- Family: Arthoniaceae
- Genus: Cryptothecia
- Species: C. methylmicrophyllinica

Binomial name
- Cryptothecia methylmicrophyllinica Aptroot & Spier (2010)

Species of lichen

Cryptothecia methylmicrophyllinica is a species of corticolous (bark-dwelling) lichen in the family Arthoniaceae. Found in Java, it was formally described as a new species in 2007 by André Aptroot and Jos Leo Spier. The type specimen was collected by Pieter Groenhart in 1954 from West Bantam. The lichen makes a thin, dull, greyish-white thallus. It contains the secondary compound 5-O-microphyllinic acid, which is detectable using thin-layer chromatography; the specific epithet refers to the presence of this substance.
