= Gallate decarboxylase =

Class of enzymes

Identifiers
- EC no.: 4.1.1.59
- CAS no.: 37290-51-0

Databases
- BRENDA: enzyme data
- ExPASy: NiceZyme view
- KEGG: enzyme entry
- MetaCyc: metabolic pathway
- Rhea: reactions
- PDB structures: RCSB PDB PDBe PDBsum
- Gene Ontology: AmiGO / QuickGO
Search
- PMC: articles
- PubMed: articles
- NCBI: proteins

Gallate decarboxylase (EC 4.1.1.59) is an enzyme characterised from Klebsiella aerogenes that catalyzes the decarboxylation of gallic acid to pyrogallol and carbon dioxide:

gallic acid
CO_{2}
pyrogallol

The reaction is part of the pathway for breakdown of tannins after tannase has generated gallic acid. It has potential as a means of converting tannin-rich feedstocks to useful small molecules. Bacteria in the human gut contain the enzyme and are capable of metabolising gallic acid.

This enzyme is a lyase, specifically a carboxy-lyase, which cleave carbon-carbon bonds. The systematic name of this enzyme class is 3,4,5-trihydroxybenzoate carboxy-lyase (pyrogallol-forming). Other names in common use include gallic acid decarboxylase and gallate carboxy-lyase.
