= Digallate =

Digallate may refer to:

- a salt of digallic acid
- a molecule containing two gallic acid moieties, like Theaflavin digallate
