= Beta-glucogallin—tetrakisgalloylglucose O-galloyltransferase =

Beta-glucogallin-tetrakisgalloylglucose O-galloyltransferase

Identifiers
- EC no.: 2.3.1.143
- CAS no.: 122653-70-7

Databases
- IntEnz: IntEnz view
- BRENDA: BRENDA entry
- ExPASy: NiceZyme view
- KEGG: KEGG entry
- MetaCyc: metabolic pathway
- PRIAM: profile
- PDB structures: RCSB PDB PDBe PDBsum
- Gene Ontology: AmiGO / QuickGO
Search
- PMC: articles
- PubMed: articles
- NCBI: proteins

Beta-glucogallin-tetrakisgalloylglucose O-galloyltransferase (EC 2.3.1.143) is an enzyme that catalyzes the chemical reaction which transfers the fifth and final gallic acid unit to a central glucose molecule to form the gallotannin, pentagalloylglucose.

glucogallin
+
1,2,3,6-tetrakis-O-galloyl-β-D-glucose
glucose
pentagalloylglucose

The two substrates of this enzyme characterised from oak (Quercus robur) are glucogallin and 1,2,3,6-tetrakis-O-galloyl-β-D-glucose. Its products are D-glucose and pentagalloylglucose. Gallotannins are widely found in foodstuffs.

This enzyme belongs to the family of transferases, specifically those acyltransferases transferring groups other than aminoacyl groups. The systematic name of this enzyme class is 1-O-galloyl-beta-D-glucose:1,2,3,6-tetrakis-O-galloyl-β-D-glucose 4-O-galloyltransferase. Other names in common use include β-glucogallin-tetragalloylglucose 4-galloyltransferase, β-glucogallin:1,2,3,6-tetra-O-galloylglucose, 4-O-galloyltransferase, β-glucogallin:1,2,3,6-tetra-O-galloyl-beta-D-glucose, and 4-O-galloyltransferase.
