= Astrothelium pseudoferrugineum =

Scientific classification
- Kingdom: Fungi
- Division: Ascomycota
- Class: Dothideomycetes
- Order: Trypetheliales
- Family: Trypetheliaceae
- Genus: Astrothelium
- Species: A. pseudoferrugineum

Binomial name
- Astrothelium pseudoferrugineum Aptroot (2016)

Species of lichen

Astrothelium pseudoferrugineum is a species of corticolous (bark-dwelling), crustose lichen in the family Trypetheliaceae. Found in Indonesia, it was formally described as a new species in 2016 by Dutch lichenologist André Aptroot. The type specimen was collected in 1937 by Pieter Groenhart on Jombang (Java); there, it was found in a disturbed rainforest growing on smooth tree bark. The lichen has a smooth and somewhat shiny to glossy, bright orange thallus with a cortex but without a prothallus. The orange crust is about 0.1 mm thick and covers areas of up to 3 cm (1.2 in) in diameter. The use of thin-layer chromatography shows the lichen contains an orange anthraquinone, possibly parietin. The main characteristics of the lichen that distinguish it from others in Astrothelium are its immersed to erumpent, whitish pseudostromata. It is named for its similarity to Astrothelium ferrugineum, from which it differs in its glossier thallus and larger ascospores (measuring 28–31 by 9–11 μm).
