= Groenhart =

Groenhart is a surname. Notable people with the surname include:

- Murthel Groenhart (born 1986), Dutch-Surinamese kickboxer and mixed martial artist
- Pieter Groenhart (1894–1965), Dutch lichenologist
