= Cryptothecia galapagoana =

Scientific classification
- Kingdom: Fungi
- Division: Ascomycota
- Class: Arthoniomycetes
- Order: Arthoniales
- Family: Arthoniaceae
- Genus: Cryptothecia
- Species: C. galapagoana

Binomial name
- Cryptothecia galapagoana Bungartz & Elix (2013)
- Holotype: Pinzón Island, Galápagos

Species of lichen

Cryptothecia galapagoana is a rare species of corticolous (bark-dwelling) crustose lichen in the family Arthoniaceae. Found on the Galápagos Islands, it was described as a new species in 2013.

== Taxonomy ==
Cryptothecia galapagoana was formally described as a new species in 2013 by the lichenologists Frank Bungartz and John Elix. It belongs to the genus Cryptothecia, a group of crustose lichens characterized by asci (spore-producing structures) that develop within ascigerous areas rather than in distinct fruiting bodies. The genus is closely related to Herpothallon, but is generally distinguished by the presence of ascigerous areas and the absence of pseudisidia (vegetative reproductive structures).

The species was initially misidentified as Cryptothecia evergladensis based on similar ascospores and chemical reactions, but further analysis revealed distinct chemical and morphological differences. C. galapagoana is named after its type locality, the Galápagos Islands, where it appears to be endemic.

== Description ==
Cryptothecia galapagoana forms a crust-like growth on bark (corticolous). The thallus (lichen body) is bordered by a white to brownish, compact margin of densely interwoven fungal filaments (hyphae). The surface has a cottony texture, lacks a cortex (protective outer layer), and has a dull, roughened appearance. Its colour ranges from pale beige to yellowish or greyish white.

A distinctive feature of this species is the abundant coverage of granular "soredia" (actually pseudisidiate granules, which are tiny vegetative reproductive structures). The medulla (inner layer) is white and densely filled with minute colourless granules and sparse calcium oxalate crystals.

The reproductive structures (ascigerous areas) develop within yellowish pale, irregular to almost spherical, coarsely frosted pustules, which break open as they mature. These pustules are typically densely covered with sorediate granules. The asci (spore-producing sacs) are bitunicate-fissitunicate (having a two-layered wall that splits during spore release), pear-shaped to broadly pear-shaped, with a short stalk and thick wall (approximately 20 μm), and contain a thick upper portion (tholus) with a small ocular chamber.

The asci form isolated to loosely grouped within the thalline pustule, loosely entangled by a few filaments that stain violet-blue with iodine (IK+ violet-blue paraphysoids). As they age, one to several asci become encapsulated by a brownish pigmentation that eventually becomes carbonized, forming visible "locules" or black dots when the pustule surface erodes. These dots are aggregated within the pustules but do not form lirellae (elongated fruiting bodies).

The ascospores are colourless (hyaline), are K+ (pale olivaceous), ovoid, muriform (divided by both longitudinal and transverse walls) with curved septa, and measure (13–)14–17.5(–19) by (6.5–)7.5–9.5(–10) μm. Each ascus contains eight spores.

In chemical spot tests, the thallus is P+ (yellow), K+ (yellow), C−, and KC−. It does not fluoresce under ultraviolet light (UV−). The medulla reacts deep blue with Lugol's iodine solution. Chemical analysis reveals the presence of confluentic acid, 2'-O-methylperlatolic acid, and 2'-O-methylmicrophyllinic acids, occasionally with traces of gyrophoric acid.

== Habitat and distribution ==
Cryptothecia galapagoana is known only from the Galápagos Islands and is likely endemic to the archipelago. It is a rare species, with only three specimens collected at the time of its original publication in 2013. The species has been found growing on the bark of the native tree Bursera graveolens and on cactus pads (Opuntia galapageia ssp. macrocarpa). It inhabits sunny, wind- and rain-exposed habitats.
