= Glucogallin =

- Chemical structure of β-glucogallin

Names
- IUPAC name [(2S,3R,4S,5S,6R)-3,4,5-Trihydroxy-6-(hydroxymethyl)oxan-2-yl]3,4,5-trihydroxybenzoate
- Other names β-Glucogallin; 1-Galloylglucose; 1-Galloyl-β-glucose; 1-O-Galloyl-β-D-glucose beta-Glucogallin; Monogalloyl glucose

Identifiers
CAS Number	13405-60-2
3D model (JSmol)	Interactive image
ChemSpider	26333268
ECHA InfoCard	100.242.331
KEGG	C01158
PubChem CID	124021
UNII	4X7JGS9BFY
CompTox Dashboard (EPA)	DTXSID00928396
- InChI: InChI=1S/C13H16O10/c1-21-12-9(18)8(17)10(19)13(23-12)22-11(20)4-2-5(14)7(16)6(15)3-4/h2-3,8-10,12-19H,1H3/t8-,9-,10+,12-,13+/m0/s1 Key: KGHSLXLLBHRMML-VKISENBKSA-N
- SMILES: CO[C@@H]1[C@H]([C@@H]([C@H]([C@@H](O1)OC(=O)c2cc(c(c(c2)O)O)O)O)O)O

Properties
Chemical formula	C_{13}H_{16}O_{10}
Molar mass	332.261 g·mol^{−1}
- Except where otherwise noted, data are given for materials in their standard state (at 25 °C [77 °F], 100 kPa). Infobox references

Glucogallin is chemical compound formed from gallic acid and β-D-glucose. It can be found in oaks species like the North American white oak (Quercus alba), European red oak (Quercus robur) and Amla fruit (Phyllanthus emblica).

It is formed as the first step in the biosynthesis of gallotannins in a pathway using the enzymes beta-glucogallin O-galloyltransferase and beta-glucogallin-tetrakisgalloylglucose O-galloyltransferase.

β-Glucogallin is aldose reductase inhibitor.

== Biosynthesis and metabolism ==
Glucogalllin is formed by the enzyme gallate 1-beta-glucosyltransferase which forms the glucosyl derivative of gallic acid using UDP-glucose as the source of the transferred sugar unit giving uridine diphosphate (UDP) as byproduct. This enzyme can be found in oak leaf preparations.

gallic acid
+ UDP-glucose
UDP
glucogallin

The enzyme beta-glucogallin O-galloyltransferase takes two molecules of glucogallin and gives one of the gallotannin, 1,6-digalloylglucose, and one of D-glucose. The product 1,6-digalloylglucose can react with another unit of glucogallin to give 1,2,6-trigalloylglucose.

2 Glucogallin
1,6-Digalloylglucose
+
D-glucose

By a similar mechanism, additional glucogallin units are added until β-penta-O-galloyl-glucose is formed.

β-penta-O-galloyl-glucose
