= Cryptothecia austrocoreana =

Scientific classification
- Domain: Eukaryota
- Kingdom: Fungi
- Division: Ascomycota
- Class: Arthoniomycetes
- Order: Arthoniales
- Family: Arthoniaceae
- Genus: Cryptothecia
- Species: C. austrocoreana

Binomial name
- Cryptothecia austrocoreana J.J.Woo, Lőkös, Farkas & Hur (2017)

Species of lichen

Cryptothecia austrocoreana is a species of crustose and corticolous (bark-dwelling) lichen in the family Arthoniaceae. Found in South Korea, it was formally described as a new species in 2017 by Jung-Jae Woo, László Lőkös, Edit Farkas, and Jae-Seoun Hur. The type specimen was collected by the first author near Seonamsa (Suncheon, Jeollanam Province) at an altitude of 160 m (520 ft); here it was found growing on the bark of Meliosma myriantha. It also grows on the bark of Carpinus tschonoskii. The lichen is only known to occur at the type locality. The specific epithet austrocoreana refers to the southern part of South Korea.

Lichen products found in Cryptothecia austrocoreana include barbatic acid as a major constituent, minor amounts of atranorin, and trace amounts of chloroatranorin. Only six other species of genus Cryptothecia contain barbatic acid.
