= Penicillium montanense =

Scientific classification
- Kingdom: Fungi
- Division: Ascomycota
- Class: Eurotiomycetes
- Order: Eurotiales
- Family: Aspergillaceae
- Genus: Penicillium
- Species: P. montanense

Binomial name
- Penicillium montanense Christensen, M.; Backus, M.P. 1962

Type strain
- ATCC 14941, CBS 310.63, FRR 3407, IFO 7740, IHEM 4375, IMI 099468, MUCL 31326, NRRL 3407

Species of fungus

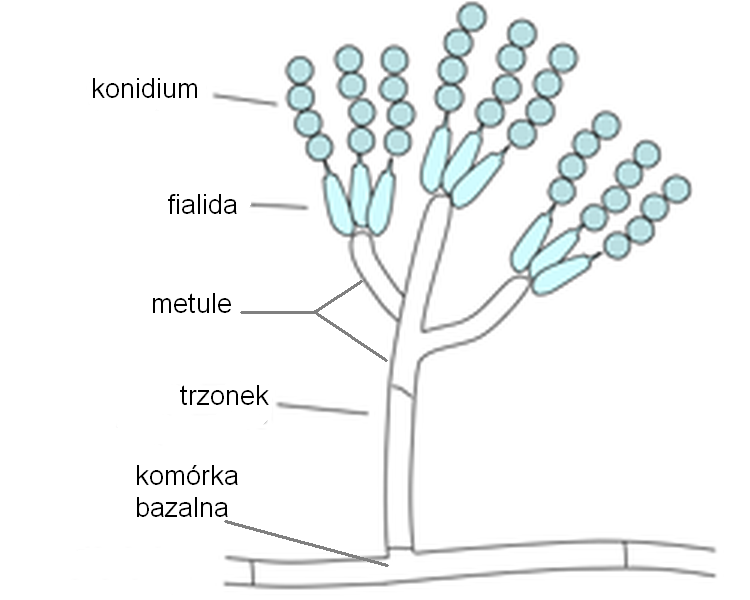
Schematic illustration

Penicillium montanense is an anamorph species of the genus of Penicillium which produces tannase.
