= Cryptothecia darwiniana =

Scientific classification
- Kingdom: Fungi
- Division: Ascomycota
- Class: Arthoniomycetes
- Order: Arthoniales
- Family: Arthoniaceae
- Genus: Cryptothecia
- Species: C. darwiniana

Binomial name
- Cryptothecia darwiniana Bungartz & Elix(013)
- Holotype: Floreana Island, the Galápagos

Species of lichen

Cryptothecia darwiniana is a species of crustose lichen in the family Arthoniaceae. Found on the Galápagos Islands, it was described as a new species in 2013.

== Taxonomy ==
Cryptothecia darwiniana belongs to the genus Cryptothecia, which is characterized by species that typically form fertile crusts with asci (spore-producing structures) loosely dispersed or closely aggregated within ascigerous areas rather than in distinct ascomata. The species is closely related to Cryptothecia assimilis and C. lichexanthonica, sharing similar morphological traits and containing the chemical compound lichexanthone, but is distinguished by having confluentic acid in addition to lichexanthone and larger ascospores.

The species was previously misidentified in historical collections. Weber (1986) reported it as Chiodecton effusum for the Galápagos, a species later cited as Syncesia effusa. Through detailed examination of specimens, researchers determined it was a previously undescribed species.

== Description ==
Cryptothecia darwiniana forms a crust-like thallus (lichen body) that grows on bark and dead wood. The thallus is clearly defined by a distinct fuzzy (byssoid) border of white to brownish, radiating hyphae (fungal filaments). The surface is smooth, shiny, and yellowish white, often becoming more intensely lemon yellow with age. It occasionally has sparse granular soredia (tiny powder-like vegetative propagules) but generally lacks the pseudisidia (finger-like vegetative structures) commonly found in the related genus Herpothallon. Its medulla (internal tissue) is white and densely filled with minute colourless crystals that dissolve in potassium hydroxide (KOH).

A distinctive feature of this species is its reproductive structures. The ascigerous areas (regions containing spore-producing structures) develop within roundish, broad, lemon yellow, pruinose (having a powdery surface), irregular pustules with a roughened surface. These pustules break open at maturity. The spore-producing asci (spore sacs) are thick-walled (about 21 μm) with a thickened upper portion (tholus) containing a small ocular chamber.

The asci occur isolated within thalline pustules and are entangled by strongly branched and interconnected, KI+ violet-blue paraphysoids (sterile filaments). As the asci age, they become encapsulated by a brownish pigmentation, eventually becoming carbonized and forming locules (small chambers). These locules are irregularly arranged or develop into striae (lines), and when eroded at their surface, they may resemble ramified, carbonized lirellae (elongated fruiting bodies).

The ascospores are colourless (hyaline), turning pale olive-green in potassium hydroxide (K+ pale olivaceous), ovoid, and muriform (divided by both longitudinal and transverse walls) with curved septa. They measure (50–)60–85(–95) by (22–)32–40(–48) μm. Each ascus typically contains eight spores, but frequently 1–2(–3) spores are aborted, resulting in (5–)6–7-spored asci.

In chemical spot tests, the thallus is P−, K−, C−, and KC−. It fluoresces bright orange under ultraviolet light, and its medulla reacts deep blue with Lugol's iodine solution. Chemical analysis reveals the presence of confluentic acid and lichexanthone.

== Habitat and distribution ==
Cryptothecia darwiniana is known only from the Galápagos Islands and may be endemic to the archipelago. It is common throughout the dry zone and lower transition zone of the islands. The species has been documented on several islands within the Galápagos, including Isabela (Sierra Negra, Alcedo, and Darwin), Santiago, Santa Cruz, Pinta, Española, Floreana, and San Cristóbal.

It grows exclusively on the bark of native and endemic tree species, most commonly Bursera graveolens and Erythrina velutina, in sunny, wind- and rain-exposed habitats. Unlike many members of the genus Cryptothecia that prefer humid, sheltered environments, C. darwiniana is adapted to the relatively dry conditions of the Galapagos lowlands. Its dense thallus and high concentrations of xanthones may represent adaptations to high solar radiation in these exposed habitats.
