= Atranorin =

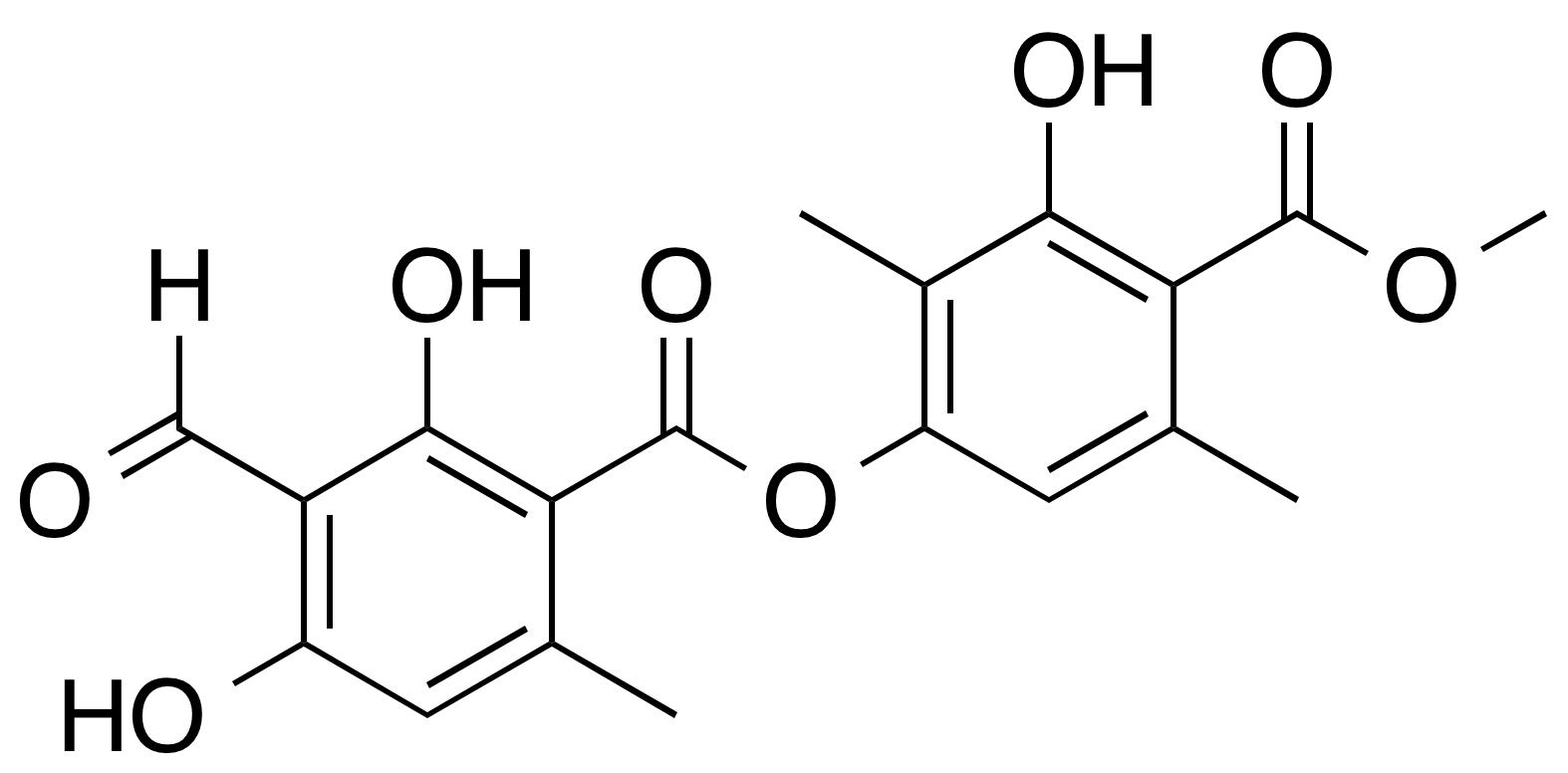

Names
- IUPAC name (3-hydroxy-4-methoxycarbonyl-2,5-dimethylphenyl) 3-formyl-2,4-dihydroxy-6-methylbenzoate
- Other names NSC 87512, NSC 249980, NSC 685591Atranorine, Parmelin, Parmelin Acid, Usnarin, Usnarin Acid

Identifiers
CAS Number	479-20-9
3D model (JSmol)	Interactive image
ChEBI	CHEBI:144119
ChEMBL	ChEMBL173395
ChemSpider	61380
ECHA InfoCard	100.006.844
EC Number	207-527-7
PubChem CID	68066
UNII	450U2VJ2VG
CompTox Dashboard (EPA)	DTXSID10197319
- InChI: InChI=1S/C19H18O8/c1-8-5-12(21)11(7-20)17(23)15(8)19(25)27-13-6-9(2)14(18(24)26-4)16(22)10(13)3/h5-7,21-23H,1-4H3 Key: YLOYKYXNDHOHHT-UHFFFAOYSA-N
- SMILES: CC1=CC(OC(C2=C(O)C(C=O)=C(O)C=C2C)=O)=C(C)C(O)=C1C(OC)=O

Properties
Chemical formula	C_{19}H_{18}O_{8}
Molar mass	374.345 g·mol^{−1}
- Except where otherwise noted, data are given for materials in their standard state (at 25 °C [77 °F], 100 kPa). Infobox references

Atranorin is a chemical substance produced by some species of lichen. It is a secondary metabolite belonging to a group of compounds known as depsides. Atranorin has analgesic, anti-inflammatory, antibacterial, antifungal, cytotoxic, antioxidant, antiviral, and immunomodulatory properties. In rare cases, people can have an allergic reaction to atranorin.

Lichens containing atranorin react K+ pale yellow and PD+ pale yellow in spot tests.
