= Cryptothecia rhizophora =

Scientific classification
- Kingdom: Fungi
- Division: Ascomycota
- Class: Arthoniomycetes
- Order: Arthoniales
- Family: Arthoniaceae
- Genus: Cryptothecia
- Species: C. rhizophora

Binomial name
- Cryptothecia rhizophora Aptroot & M.Cáceres (2016)
- Holotype: Reserva extrativista Maracá, Brazil

Species of lichen

Cryptothecia rhizophora is a species of corticolous (bark-dwelling) crustose lichen in the family Arthoniaceae. This lichen was discovered growing on tree bark in the primary rainforest of Brazil's Amapá state, and described as a new species in 2016. It is distinctive in its genus for producing long, branching, root-like structures called rhizomorphs that extend outward from the main thallus.

== Taxonomy ==
Cryptothecia rhizophora was described as new to science in 2016 by André Aptroot and Marcela da Silva Cáceres from material collected in northern Brazil (Amapá). The holotype was gathered on tree bark in primary tall forest at about 30 m elevation in the Maracá Extractive Reserve (municipality of Mazagão). The specific epithet refers to the species' abundant rhizomorphs.

In their notes, the authors stressed two characters that set it apart within Cryptothecia: the ascigerous (spore-producing) areas contain lichexanthone (rather than the whole thallus), and the species has distinct, partly pigmented rhizohyphae. Superficially similar rhizomorphs are otherwise only known in Syncesia rhizomorpha, which differs by having apothecia, transversely septate spores, different chemistry, and a brown prothallus.

== Description ==
The thallus is thin (about 0.1–0.2 mm), dull, uncorticate, and almost white, with long, branching, superficial rhizomorphs up to 0.2 mm wide that extend into the prothallus. The prothallus is about 2 mm wide and flesh-colored, composed of branched, felty rhizomorphs. The photobiont is trentepohlioid, with cells about 5–9 μm. Ascigerous areas are rounded, white, and barely visible in daylight but become conspicuous under ultraviolet light; they measure about 0.5–0.9 mm in diameter and up to about 0.3 mm high, with brown asci visible only after the surface is scraped. Interascal tissue consists of much-branched, anastomosing hyphae. The asci are more or less spherical (globose), measuring about 200 μm in diameter, and contain 1 to 4 spores (usually 4). Ascospores are hyaline, pyriform, curved, and irregularly muriform with partly oblique septa; the central lumina are about the same size as the outer and upper lumina. Spores measure 85–95 × 32–37 μm and are surrounded by a 2–5 μm gelatinous sheath. Pycnidia were not observed. In terms of spot test reactions, the thallus is UV−, C−, P−, K−; the ascigerous areas are UV+ (yellow); thin-layer chromatography detected lichexanthone.

== Habitat and distribution ==
The species grows on tree bark in primary tall forest within the eastern Amazon. In addition to Amapá, it has been documented from the states of Mato Grosso and Mato Grosso do Sul.
