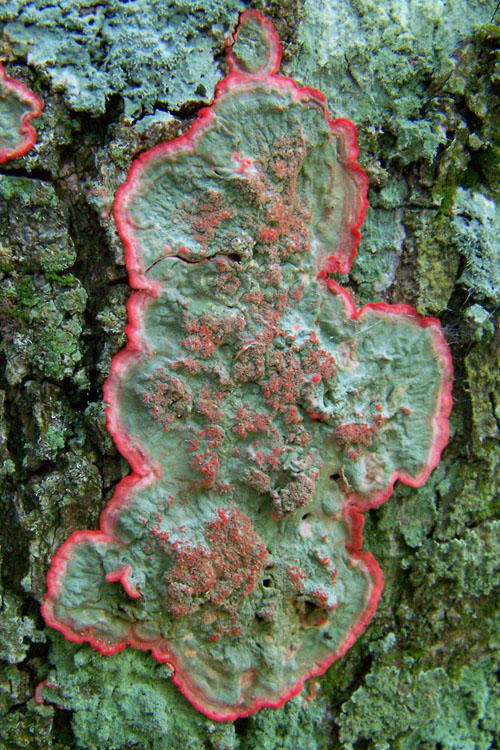
- Growing on guayaibi (Patagonula amaricana) tree in Chaco Province, northern Argentina

Scientific classification
- Kingdom: Fungi
- Division: Ascomycota
- Class: Arthoniomycetes
- Order: Arthoniales
- Family: Arthoniaceae
- Genus: Cryptothecia
- Species: C. rubrocincta

Binomial name
- Cryptothecia rubrocincta (Ehrenb.) G.Thor (1991)

Synonyms
- Byssus sanguinea Sw. Chiodecton rubrocinctum (Ehrenb.) Nyl. Chiodecton sanguineum (Sw.) Vain. Corticium rubrocinctum (Ehrenb.) Bres. Herpothallon sanguineum (Sw.) Tobler; Hypochnus rubrocinctus Ehrenb. Hypochnus sanguineus (Sw.) Kuntze; Thelephora sanguinea Sw.

= Cryptothecia rubrocincta =

Species of fungus

Cryptothecia rubrocincta is a species of lichen in the fungal family Arthoniaceae. The species is distributed in subtropical and tropical locations throughout the southeastern United States, as well as Central and South America, and has been collected infrequently in a few locales in Africa. The body of the lichen forms continuous, circular crust-like patches on dead wood, readily recognizable by the prominent red pigment. The older, central region is covered with red, spherical to cylindrical granules. Moving outwards from the center, zones of color may be distinguished, the first gray-green, the second white, and finally a bright red cottony rim. The red and green colors of this unmistakable woodland lichen give the appearance of a Christmas wreath, suggestive of its common North American name, the Christmas (wreath) lichen. The red pigment, called chiodectonic acid, is one of several chemicals the lichen produces to help tolerate inhospitable growing conditions.

== Taxonomy and naming ==
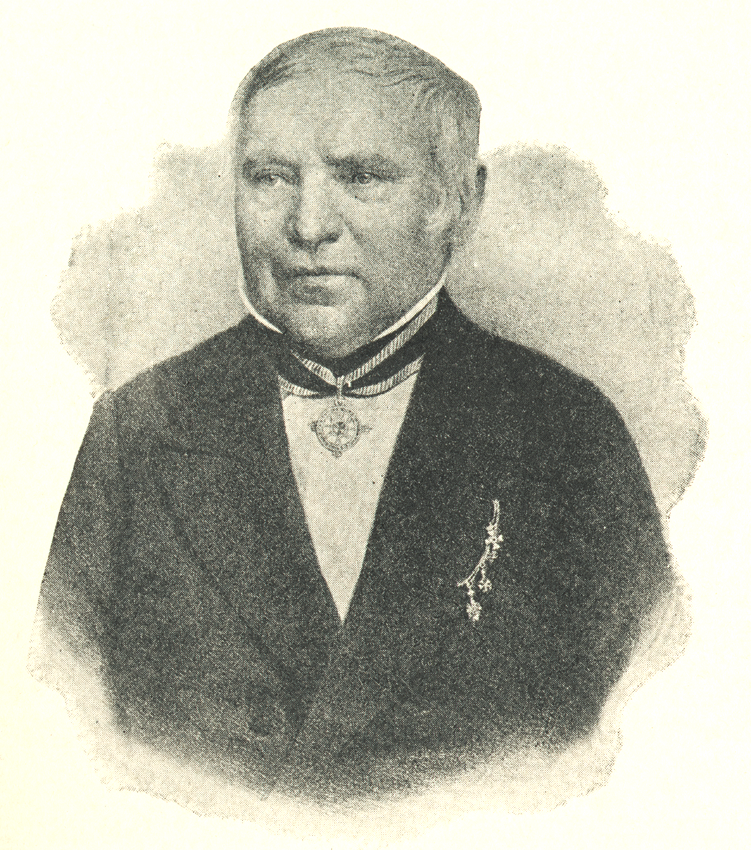
German naturalist Christian Gottfried Ehrenberg first described the lichen in 1820.

The classification of the genus Cryptothecia has been unclear, and historically, C. rubrocincta has been placed in several different genera. Like all lichens, C. rubrocincta is an association of a fungus (the mycobiont) with a photosynthetic organism (the photobiont), in this case, an algae. Initially, it was unknown whether the mycobiont component of C. rubrocincta was an ascomycete or a basidiomycete. Although the vast majority of lichen mycobionts are from the Ascomycota, in 1937 German lichenologist Friedrich Tobler believed the mycobiont to be a basidiomycete, because he interpreted some unusual microscopic structures to be clamp connections, structures associated only with the basidiomycete fungi. In another publication later that year, he specified the mycobiont to be a hymenomycete, and described the monotypic genus Herpothallion to supersede the old name Chiodecton sanguineum. Although Vernon Ahmadjian corroborated the presence of clamp connections in the species when he studied the species' cytology in 1967, other researchers did not find clamp connections in specimens collected from different countries. Further doubt was cast on the possibility of a basidiomycete mycobiont with the discovery of the depside confluentic acid in 1966, concentric bodies in 1975, and woronin bodies in 1983, as all of these characteristics are restricted to Ascomycetes.

The International Code of Botanical Nomenclature states that names of fungi adopted by Fries in Systema Mycologicum vols. 1–3 are sanctioned, that is, they are conserved against earlier homonyms and competing synonyms. This means that the name Hypochnus rubrocinctum has priority over Byssus sanguinea. The type material of H. rubrocinctum was examined by Christian Gottfried Ehrenberg in Berlin; it has since been destroyed, probably during the Second World War. The drawing in Erhenberg's 1820 publication serves as the lectotype. The species was transferred to the genus Cryptothecia by Swedish lichenologist Göran Thor in 1991, on the basis of its similarity with C. striata such as the thallus with radiate ridges, granular isidia, and presence of para-depsides (gyrophoric acid in C. striata and confluentic acid in C. rubrocincta).

The red and green of C. rubrocincta give it a Christmas wreath look, hence its common North American name, the Christmas wreath lichen. The specific epithet is derived from the Latin words ruber "red" and cinctus "girdled/encircled" or "banded". The other epithet sanguineum is the neuter form of the Latin adjective sanguineus "bloody".

== Description ==
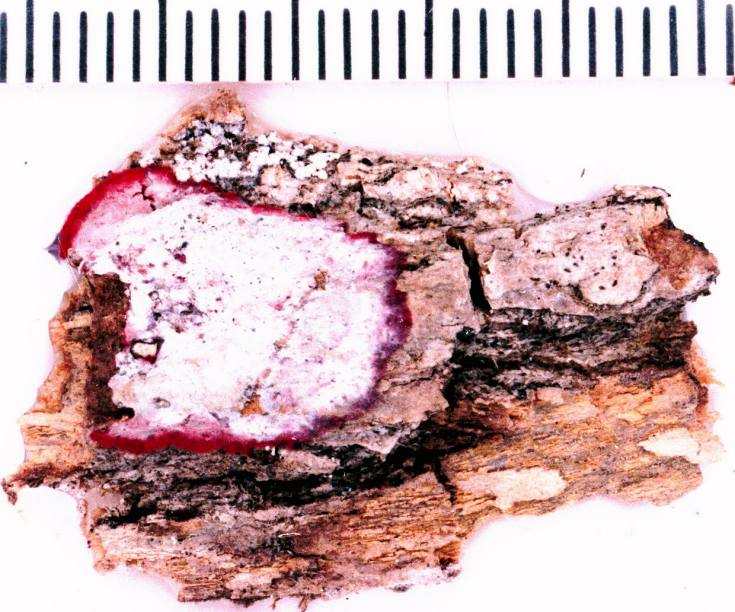
Herbarium specimens of C. rubrocincta growing on Taxodium distichum

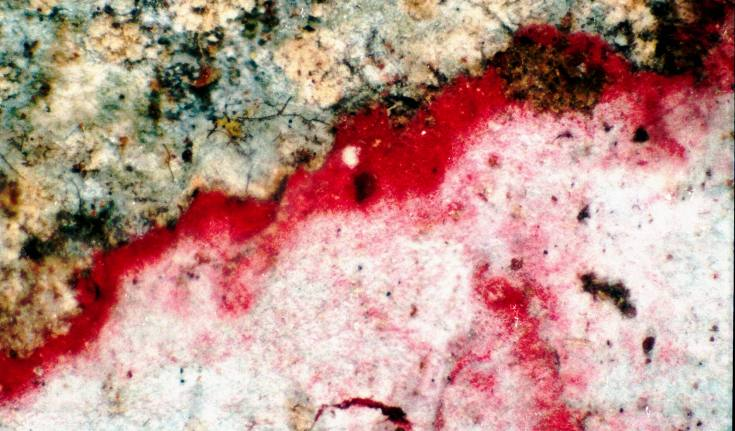
...and oak (below). The scale marks are millimeters.

Cryptothecia rubrocincta is a crustose lichen, because it grows in the form of a surface crust. The thallus, or body of the lichen is spread out flat and can be either tightly to loosely attached to the growing surface. It is 0.15–0.30 mm thick, and can be smooth, or have low radiating ridges. The older, central region of the lichen surface has many reproductive structures called isidia; they resemble granules that are 0.1–0.4 by 0.1 mm. The species relies entirely on vegetative means to reproduce, and is not known to have any sexual structures. From the center outwards, three color zones can be differentiated in mature specimens; the first grayish-green, the second white, and finally a bright red cottony rim.

The lichen has a distinct prothallus—fibers of whitish fungal hyphae at the edge that lack photobiont, and which project beyond the thallus onto the growing surface. The prothallus is red to whitish in the inner part, red the in outer part. The surface of the thallus does not have a well-defined cortex, an outer layer of well-packed hyphae. The medulla (a loosely arranged layer of hyphae below the cortex and photobiont zone) is whitish but the lower part is red. It has few to many calcium oxalate crystals that are 3–8 μm diameter. The hyphae of the medulla have many such crystals on the walls, that are 1–2 μm in diameter. The algal photobiont (technically a phycobiont, as it is a green algal photosynthetic partner) is from the genus Trentepohlia. Normally, the algae is long and filamentous; when in the lichen state, it is divided into shorter filaments. The alga has a large chloroplast that contains droplets of beta-carotene. The lichen is heteromerous, meaning that the mycobiont and photobiont components are in well-defined layers, with the photobiont in a more or less distinct zone between the upper cortex and the medulla. Cells are single or a few cells aggregated, with dimensions of about 8–15 by 5–11 μm.

The yeast Fellomyces mexicanus, an anamorphic member of the family Cuniculitremaceae, was discovered growing epiphytically on the lichen in 2005.

== Distribution and habitat ==
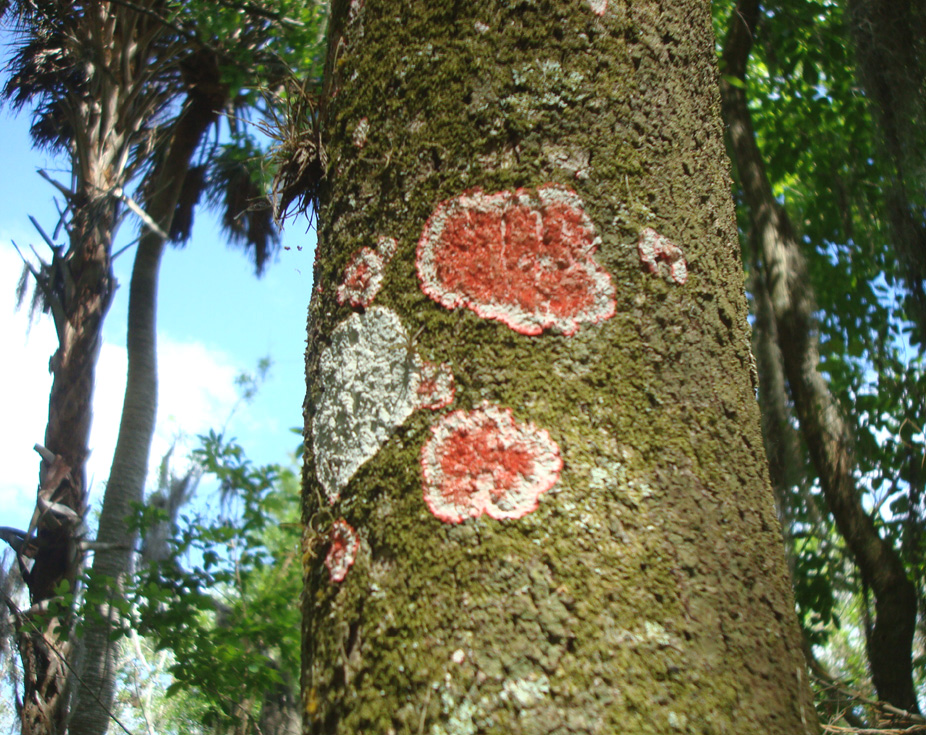
Growing on Sabal palmetto at Myakka River State Park, Florida

The lichen is widely distributed in the southeastern United States; in 1954 the north border of its distribution was given as a line passing through southern Louisiana, Mississippi, Alabama and Georgia. Although the northern limit was extended to southern Delaware, the author later revised his opinion, and the northern limit is thought to be North Carolina. In North Carolina, it is found on Smith Island, a notable location because it represents the northern limit of the distribution of cabbage palmetto (Sabal palmetto). The presence of this 6 meter (20 ft) tree interspersed among the dominant tree species Quercus virginiana give the island a subtropical appearance—consistent with the lichen's preferred climate.

Cryptothecia rubrocincta is also widespread in tropical and subtropical areas of the West Indies and Central and South America. In South America it is found north of Chile and Argentina. It is rarer in Africa, having only been collected from three geographically widely separated mountain regions: São Tomé and Príncipe, Tanzania, and DR Congo. The lichen may be found at altitudes ranging from sea level to 2,600 metres (8,500 ft) (in Colombia).

The lichen typically grows on rough bark in sheltered and shaded habitats in moist and dense subtropical forests. More rarely, it is found on rocks or on leaves. In the USA it occurs in hammocks (hardwood forests) and swamps which have standing water, at least part of the year. It is also common in oak or oak-pine scrub vegetation. The species is often associated with Cryptothecia striata in the USA.

== Chemistry and color ==
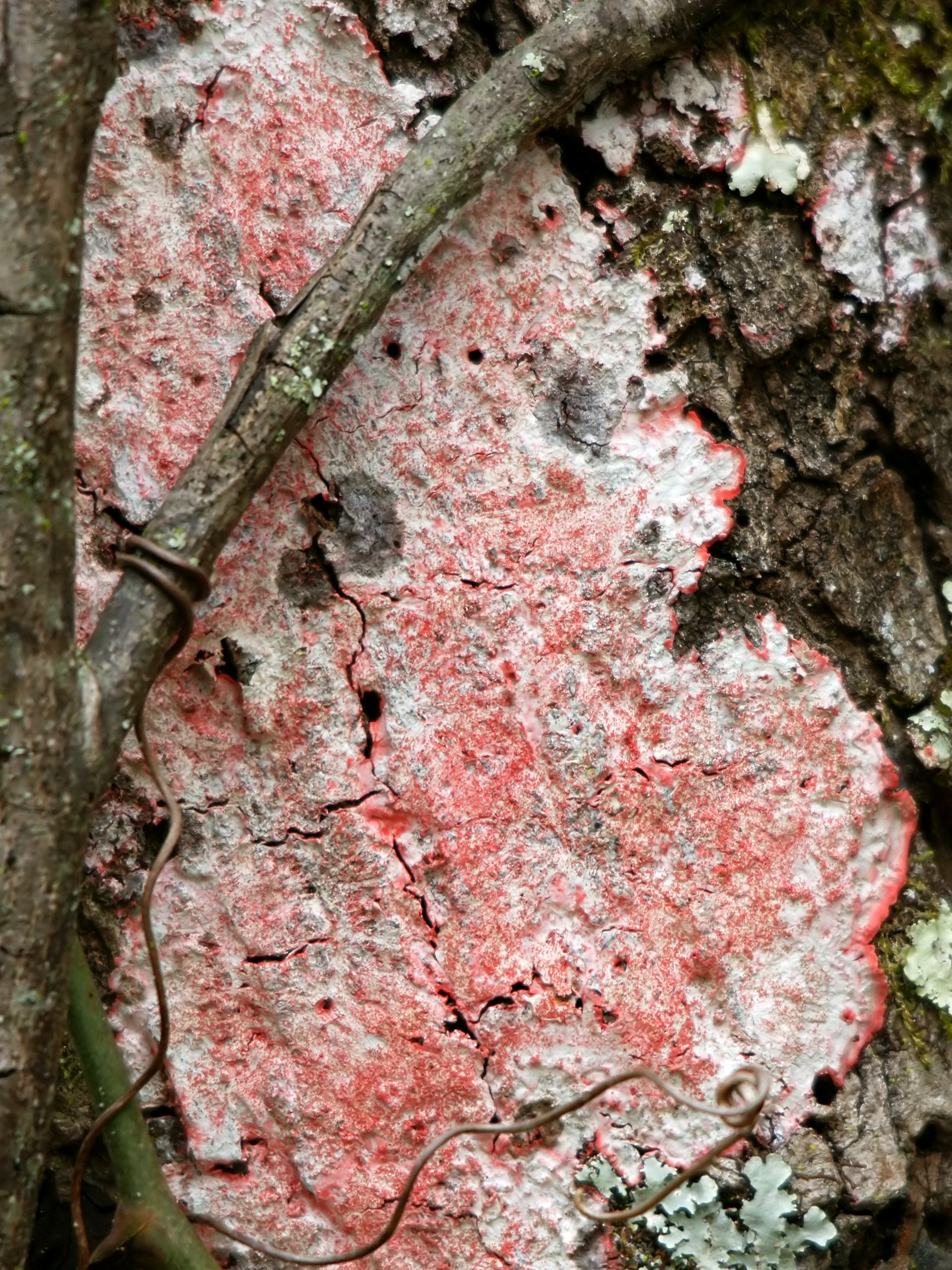
In Lake County, Florida

Cryptothecia rubrocincta is easily recognized by the bright red pigment in the thallus. The pigment, first isolated from the species by Hesse in 1904, is called chiodectonic acid. The lichen also contains the colorless depside compound confluentinic acid. A 2005 study employed the technique Raman spectroscopy to determine the chemical composition of the differently colored zones. The white crystalline zone contains calcium oxalate dihydrate, or weddellite, a chemical substance found in other lichens and extremophiles growing on calcium-rich surfaces. Some have suggested that the calcium oxalate serves in the organism's survival strategy: the storage of water as a crystalline hydrate is essential for periods of drought in desiccated environments, and calcium oxalate has been identified as dissuading herbivores. Because the lichen grows on calcium-poor surfaces, calcium ions are thought to be acquired from rain, bird droppings, and airborne particles.

The chemicals in the red-colored zone include an aromatic quinone, beta-carotene, and chlorophyll. The quinone is deep-red colored pigment chiodectonic acid, thought to function as a radiation protectant; in combination with beta-carotene, which has an established role in cellular DNA repair following exposure of the organism to UV-damage, such radiation protectants are often found in lichens and in extremophilic situations and are essential for survival.

The lighter-colored pink zone, located on the inside of the red zone, contains a mixture of chiodectonic acid, beta-carotene and calcium oxalate dihydrate, the red and white mixture of the chiodectonic acid and the calcium oxalate giving rise to the characteristically lighter color.

The elliptical brown-colored flecks, which can be observed in both the red and pink zones of the thallus, are made of confluentic acid and calcium oxalate monohydrate. The monohydrate is thought to be a more chemically stable metabolic byproduct of calcium oxalate dihydrate; the function of confluentic acid in the brown flecks is unclear.
