= Merochlorophaeic acid =

Identifiers
CAS Number	2879-80-3
3D model (JSmol)	Interactive image
ChEBI	CHEBI:144270
ChemSpider	63001362
PubChem CID	71436664
CompTox Dashboard (EPA)	DTXSID001336850
- InChI: InChI=1S/C24H30O8/c1-5-7-8-10-15-12-17(25)22(21(26)20(15)23(27)28)32-24(29)19-14(9-6-2)11-16(30-3)13-18(19)31-4/h11-13,25-26H,5-10H2,1-4H3,(H,27,28); Key: AAKHGLJWUOZNTQ-UHFFFAOYSA-N
- SMILES: CCCCCC1=CC(=C(C(=C1C(=O)O)O)OC(=O)C2=C(C=C(C=C2OC)OC)CCC)O

Properties
Chemical formula	C_{24}H_{30}O_{8}
Molar mass	446.496 g·mol^{−1}
- Except where otherwise noted, data are given for materials in their standard state (at 25 °C [77 °F], 100 kPa). Infobox references

Merochlorophaeic acid is a depside with the molecular formula C_{24}H_{30}O_{8} which has been isolated from the lichen Cladonia merochlorophaea.
