= 1,3,6-Trigalloylglucose =

- Chemical structure of 1,3,6-trigalloyl glucose

Names
- IUPAC name β-D-Glucopyranose 1,3,6-tris(3,4,5-trihydroxybenzoate)
- Systematic IUPAC name (2R,3R,4S,5R,6S)-3,5-Dihydroxyoxane-2,4,6-triyl tris(3,4,5-trihydroxybenzoate)
- Other names 1,3,6-Trigalloyl-β-D-glucose; 1,3,6-Tris-O-(3,4,5-trihydroxybenzoyl)-β-D-glucopyranose

Identifiers
CAS Number	18483-17-5
3D model (JSmol)	Interactive image
ChEBI	CHEBI:24182
ChEMBL	ChEMBL389895
ChemSpider	398744
ECHA InfoCard	100.155.493
EC Number	627-120-1
KEGG	C17458
PubChem CID	452707
UNII	O8718334XJ
CompTox Dashboard (EPA)	DTXSID3041667
- InChI: InChI=1S/C27H24O18/c28-11-1-8(2-12(29)18(11)34)24(39)42-7-17-21(37)23(44-25(40)9-3-13(30)19(35)14(31)4-9)22(38)27(43-17)45-26(41)10-5-15(32)20(36)16(33)6-10/h1-6,17,21-23,27-38H,7H2/t17-,21-,22-,23+,27+/m1/s1 Key: RNKMOGIPOMVCHO-SJMVAQJGSA-N; InChI=1/C27H24O18/c28-11-1-8(2-12(29)18(11)34)24(39)42-7-17-21(37)23(44-25(40)9-3-13(30)19(35)14(31)4-9)22(38)27(43-17)45-26(41)10-5-15(32)20(36)16(33)6-10/h1-6,17,21-23,27-38H,7H2/t17-,21-,22-,23+,27+/m1/s1 Key: RNKMOGIPOMVCHO-SJMVAQJGBQ
- SMILES: c1c(cc(c(c1O)O)O)C(=O)OC[C@@H]2[C@H]([C@@H]([C@H]([C@@H](O2)OC(=O)c3cc(c(c(c3)O)O)O)O)OC(=O)c4cc(c(c(c4)O)O)O)O

Properties
Chemical formula	C_{27}H_{24}O_{18}
Molar mass	636.46 g/mol

Hazards
- GHS labelling
Pictograms	(GHS07: Exclamation mark)
Signal word	Warning
Hazard statements	H315, H319, H335
Precautionary statements	P261, P264, P271, P280, P302+P352, P304+P340, P305+P351+P338, P312, P321, P332+P313, P337+P313, P362, P403+P233, P405, P501
- Except where otherwise noted, data are given for materials in their standard state (at 25 °C [77 °F], 100 kPa). Infobox references

1,3,6-Trigalloylglucose, or more specifically 1,3,6-Tri-O-galloyl-β-D-glucose, is a gallotannin. It can be found in Paeonia lactiflora and Terminalia chebula.
