= Cryptothecia methylperlatolica =

Scientific classification
- Kingdom: Fungi
- Division: Ascomycota
- Class: Arthoniomycetes
- Order: Arthoniales
- Family: Arthoniaceae
- Genus: Cryptothecia
- Species: C. methylperlatolica

Binomial name
- Cryptothecia methylperlatolica Aptroot (2022)

Species of lichen-forming fungus

Cryptothecia methylperlatolica is a corticolous (bark-dwelling) lichen in the family Arthoniaceae. It is a small crustose lichen that forms whitish-gray patches on tree bark in primary rainforest in western Brazil. It is distinguished by the absence of powdery reproductive structures, by linear spore-producing areas that are slightly raised above the surface, and by the presence of 2-O-methylperlatolic acid. It was formally described in 2022 from material collected in a municipal nature park near Porto Velho in Rondônia State, and it remains known only from Brazil.

== Taxonomy ==
Cryptothecia methylperlatolica was described in 2022 by André Aptroot from bark-collected material collected in a municipal nature park near Porto Velho, Rondônia, Brazil, at an elevation of about 100 m (330 ft). The holotype (M.E.S. Cáceres 15215 & A. Aptroot) is deposited in the herbarium of the Instituto de Botânica (ISE). Within Cryptothecia, it is characterized by a whitish-gray thallus that lacks soredia, linear spore-producing areas that are slightly raised above the surface, broadly ellipsoid muriform (multi-chambered) ascospores (45–50 × 27–30 μm), and the presence of 2-O-methylperlatolic acid in the thallus. It was considered close to C. albomaculans, which differs in having a heteromerous thallus and spore-producing areas that are flush with the surface. The specific epithet methylperlatolica refers to 2-O-methylperlatolic acid, the compound detected in the thallus.

== Description ==
The thallus of Cryptothecia methylperlatolica is crustose and continuous, forming a dull, whitish gray patch up to 25 cm (9.8 in) across and up to 0.1 mm thick. It lacks a cortex and soredia, and it is bordered by a narrow brown hyphal prothallus about 0.3 mm wide. The photobiont is trentepohlioid (a member of the green algal genus Trentepohlia). Spore-producing are whitish, linear and flat, 0.5–6 × 0.3–0.5 mm, and somewhat raised above the surrounding thallus. The asci are visible to the naked eye as ochraceous dots, immersed in groups of about 5–50 within these spore-producing areas, and are more or less spherical, about 100–125 μm in diameter. Ascospores are produced eight per ascus. They are hyaline (colorless), muriform, broadly ellipsoid, and measure 45–50 × 27–30 μm, without a gelatinous sheath. Pycnidia have not been observed. In standard spot tests, the thallus is UV−, C−, K−, KC− and P−. Thin-layer chromatography detectes 2-O-methylperlatolic acid as the main lichen substance.

== Habitat and distribution ==
Cryptothecia methylperlatolica grows on tree bark in primary rain forest at Parque Natural Municipal near Porto Velho (Rondônia, western Brazil), at around 100 m (330 ft) elevation. As of its original publication, it had not been reported from outside Brazil. No additional occurrences were reported up to 2025.
