= Gallocatechin gallate =

- Chemical structure of gallocatechin gallate

Names
- IUPAC name (2S,3R)-2-(3,4,5-Trihydroxyphenyl)-3,4-dihydro-1(2H)-benzopyran-3,5,7-triol 3-(3,4,5-trihydroxybenzoate)
- Other names (-)-Gallocatechin gallate

Identifiers
CAS Number	5127-64-0
3D model (JSmol)	Interactive image
ChEBI	CHEBI:156271
ChemSpider	172662
PubChem CID	199472
UNII	0C056HB16M
CompTox Dashboard (EPA)	DTXSID701336201
- InChI: InChI=1S/C22H18O11/c23-10-5-12(24)11-7-18(33-22(31)9-3-15(27)20(30)16(28)4-9)21(32-17(11)6-10)8-1-13(25)19(29)14(26)2-8/h1-6,18,21,23-30H,7H2/t18-,21+/m1/s1 Key: WMBWREPUVVBILR-NQIIRXRSSA-N; InChI=1/C22H18O11/c23-10-5-12(24)11-7-18(33-22(31)9-3-15(27)20(30)16(28)4-9)21(32-17(11)6-10)8-1-13(25)19(29)14(26)2-8/h1-6,18,21,23-30H,7H2/t18-,21+/m1/s1 Key: WMBWREPUVVBILR-NQIIRXRSBC
- SMILES: C1[C@H]([C@@H](OC2=CC(=CC(=C21)O)O)C3=CC(=C(C(=C3)O)O)O)OC(=O)C4=CC(=C(C(=C4)O)O)O

Properties
Chemical formula	C_{22}H_{18}O_{11}
Molar mass	458.375 g·mol^{−1}
- Except where otherwise noted, data are given for materials in their standard state (at 25 °C [77 °F], 100 kPa). verify (what is ?) Infobox references

Gallocatechin gallate (GCG) is the ester of gallocatechin and gallic acid and a type of catechin. It is an epimer of epigallocatechin gallate (EGCG).

In a high temperature environment, an epimerization change is likely to occur, because heating results in the conversion from EGCG to GCG. According to the referenced study the resulting GCG (the epimer of EGCG) results in even lower dietary cholesterol absorption than occurs with EGCG. While this may be a beneficial outcome with respect to cholesterol reduction activity, for those wishing to maximize the EGCG content of green tea infusions, it is still appropriate to use high temperatures, as long as it is taking into account that extreme conditions will lead to small reductions in total EGCG, for example a 12.4% reduction in total EGCG when heated for 30 minutes at 100 °C.
