= Cryptothecia aleurinoides =

Scientific classification
- Domain: Eukaryota
- Kingdom: Fungi
- Division: Ascomycota
- Class: Arthoniomycetes
- Order: Arthoniales
- Family: Arthoniaceae
- Genus: Cryptothecia
- Species: C. aleurinoides

Binomial name
- Cryptothecia aleurinoides Aptroot & Wolseley (2009)

Species of lichen

Cryptothecia aleurinoides is a species of corticolous (bark-dwelling), crustose lichen in the family Arthoniaceae. Found in Thailand, it was formally described by lichenologists André Aptroot and Pat Wolseley. Its thallus is up to 5 cm (2 in) in diameter and less than 0.1 mm thick, and is white in colour. Its ascospores are ellipsoid in shape, muriform (divided into compartments or locules by intersecting longitudinal and transverse septa), and measure 40–45 by 22–259 μm. It contains the substance 5-O-methylmicrophyllinic acid, which, at the time of publication, was the first time this lichen product had been recorded from genus Cryptothecia.
