= Cryptothecia albomaculatella =

Scientific classification
- Kingdom: Fungi
- Division: Ascomycota
- Class: Arthoniomycetes
- Order: Arthoniales
- Family: Arthoniaceae
- Genus: Cryptothecia
- Species: C. albomaculatella

Binomial name
- Cryptothecia albomaculatella Aptroot & Wolseley (2009)

Species of lichen

Cryptothecia albomaculatella is a species of corticolous (bark-dwelling), crustose lichen in the family Arthoniaceae. It is a common lichen species in Thailand, and has also been recorded from Assam, India.

== Taxonomy ==
It was formally described in 2009 by the lichenologist André Aptroot and the botanist Pat Wolseley. The type specimen was collected from Khlong Plou, Kapou Kapiang station (Uthai Thani province).

== Description ==
Its thallus is up to 10 cm (4 in) in diameter and 0.1–0.2 mm thick, and is areolate and pale yellowish in colour. Instead of making discrete sexual reproductive structures like apothecia, this lichen instead has an "ascigerous zone", a region on the thallus where asci (spore-bearing cells) are located. This zone, slightly elevated in comparison to the rest of the thallus, has a roughly circular to irregular outline, and is covered with white pruina. When the ascigerous zone is abraded, conspicuous black spots are revealed–these are the asci, which are pyriform (shaped like an inverted pear). The ascospores, which number 6 to 8 per ascus, are muriform (divided into compartments or locules by intersecting longitudinal and transverse septa), and measure 50–65 by 22–29 μm. It contains the substances barbatic acid and obtusatic acid.

Cryptothecia albomaculatella is somewhat similar in appearance to Cryptothecia albomaculans, found in the Andaman Islands, but this species has slightly smaller ascospores (47–57 by 24–30 μm) and different chemistry (containing 2'-O-methylperlatolic acid).

== Distribution ==
In addition to the province of its type locality, Uthai Thani, Cryptothecia albomaculatella has also been documented from the Chiang Mai and Lampang provinces of Thailand, and in 2019 was reported from the Dima Hasao district in Assam, India. C. albomaculatella is one of 13 Cryptothecia species found in Thailand, and is one of the most common lichen species in Thailand.
