= Digallic acid =

Names
- Preferred IUPAC name 3,4-Dihydroxy-5-[(3,4,5-trihydroxybenzoyl)oxy]benzoic acid
- Other names Digallate; 3,4-dihydroxy-5-(3,4,5-trihydroxybenzoyloxy)benzoate m-digallic acid Digalloyl ester

Identifiers
CAS Number	536-08-3
3D model (JSmol)	Interactive image; Interactive image
ChEMBL	ChEMBL366356
ChemSpider	334
ECHA InfoCard	100.007.842
PubChem CID	341
UNII	404KO0584X
CompTox Dashboard (EPA)	DTXSID50871747
- InChI: InChI=1S/C14H10O9/c15-7-2-6(3-8(16)11(7)18)14(22)23-10-4-5(13(20)21)1-9(17)12(10)19/h1-4,15-19H,(H,20,21) Key: COVFEVWNJUOYRL-UHFFFAOYSA-N; InChI=1/C14H10O9/c15-7-2-6(3-8(16)11(7)18)14(22)23-10-4-5(13(20)21)1-9(17)12(10)19/h1-4,15-19H,(H,20,21) Key: COVFEVWNJUOYRL-UHFFFAOYAG
- SMILES: C1=C(C=C(C(=C1O)O)O)C(=O)OC2=CC(=CC(=C2O)O)C(=O)[O-]; O=C(O)c2cc(O)c(O)c(OC(=O)c1cc(O)c(O)c(O)c1)c2

Properties
Chemical formula	C_{14}H_{10}O_{9}
Molar mass	322.225 g·mol^{−1}
- Except where otherwise noted, data are given for materials in their standard state (at 25 °C [77 °F], 100 kPa). verify (what is ?) Infobox references

Digallic acid is a polyphenolic compound found in Pistacia lentiscus. Digallic acid is also present in the molecule of tannic acid. Digalloyl esters involve either -meta, or -para depside bonds.

Tannase is an enzyme that uses digallate to produce gallic acid. This enzyme can also be used to produce digallic acid from gallotannins.
