= Lonepinella =

Scientific classification
- Domain: Bacteria
- Kingdom: Pseudomonadati
- Phylum: Pseudomonadota
- Class: Gammaproteobacteria
- Order: Pasteurellales
- Family: Pasteurellaceae
- Genus: Lonepinella; Osawa et al. 1996

Type species
- Lonepinella koalarum

Species
- L. koalarum

Genus of bacteria

Lonepinella is a Gram-negative, facultatively anaerobic and tannase-producing genus of bacteria from the family of Pasteurellaceae with one known species (Lonepinella koalarum). Lonepinella koalarum has been isolated from the faeces of koalas.
