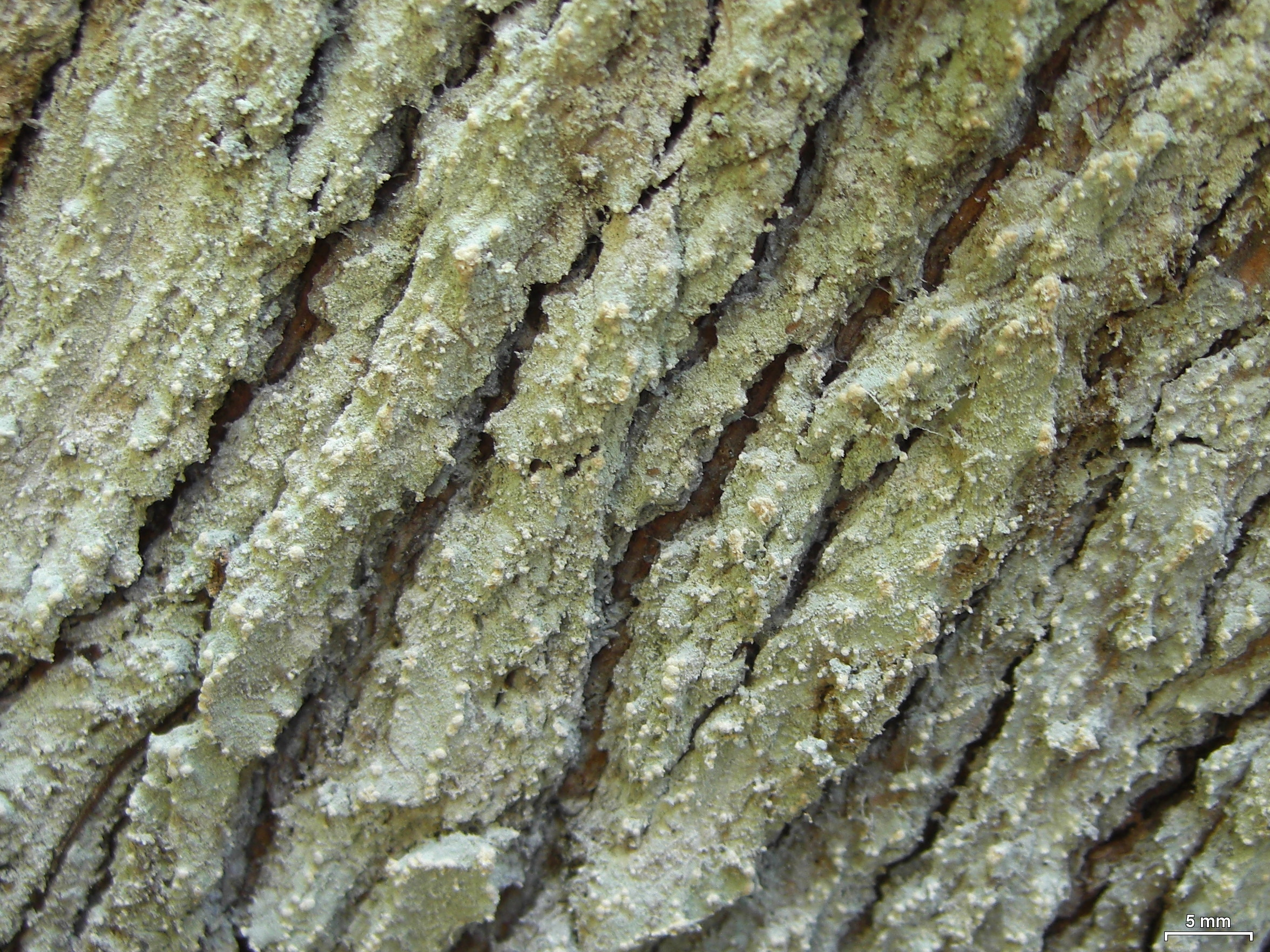

Scientific classification
- Domain: Eukaryota
- Kingdom: Fungi
- Division: Ascomycota
- Class: Arthoniomycetes
- Order: Arthoniales
- Family: Arthoniaceae
- Genus: Cryptothecia
- Species: C. punctosorediata

Binomial name
- Cryptothecia punctosorediata Sparrius (2005)

= Cryptothecia punctosorediata =

Species of lichen

Cryptothecia punctosorediata is a species of corticolous (bark-dwelling) crustose lichen in the family Arthoniaceae. Found in northern Thailand, it was formally described as a new species in 2005 by Laurens Sparrius. The type specimen was collected from Ban Hauy Som Poy (Nan Province) at an elevation of 300 m (980 ft); here it was found growing on the smooth bark of the mango tree Mangifera indica. It contains the secondary compound gyrophoric acid. The specific epithet punctosorediata refers to the punctiform (dot-like and minute) soralia. At the time of publication, C. punctosorediata was the only species of Cryptothecia known to have discrete soralia.
