= Cryptothecia demethylconfluentica =

Scientific classification
- Kingdom: Fungi
- Division: Ascomycota
- Class: Arthoniomycetes
- Order: Arthoniales
- Family: Arthoniaceae
- Genus: Cryptothecia
- Species: C. demethylconfluentica

Binomial name
- Cryptothecia demethylconfluentica Aptroot (2022)

Species of lichen-forming fungus

Cryptothecia demethylconfluentica is a corticolous (bark-dwelling) lichen in the family Arthoniaceae. It is a small crustose lichen that forms pale ochre-coloured crusts on tree bark in primary rainforest in northeastern Brazil. The species is distinguished by its powdery reproductive granules scattered across the thallus surface and by the presence of two specific chemical compounds in its tissues that are used to identify it. It was formally described in 2022 from material collected in Parque Nacional Serra de Itabaiana in Sergipe State and remains known only from this locality.

== Taxonomy ==
Cryptothecia demethylconfluentica was described in 2022 by André Aptroot from material collected on tree bark in Parque Nacional Serra de Itabaiana (Sergipe, Brazil) at about 400 m (1,300 ft) elevation. The holotype (M.E.S. Cáceres 18063 & A. Aptroot) is deposited in the herbarium of the Instituto de Botânica (ISE). The species is a bark-dwelling Cryptothecia with colorless, muriform (multi-chambered) ascospores measuring 50–56 × 20–22.5 μm, and a thallus containing demethylconfluentic and confluentic acid. In a global key to Cryptothecia, it keys out using this combination of spore size and chemistry.

== Description ==
The thallus of Cryptothecia demethylconfluentica is crustose and continuous, forming a dull, pale ochraceous patch up to about 15 cm (6 in) across while remaining under 0.1 mm thick. It lacks a cortex and is not bordered by a distinct prothallus. It bears granular soredia that lie on the thallus rather than being grouped into soralia. The photobiont is trentepohlioid. The spore-producing areas are not visibly distinct from the surrounding thallus. The asci are not visible to the naked eye. They occur singly, are immersed in the thallus, and are roughly spherical, about 100–125 μm in diameter. Ascospores are produced eight per ascus. They are hyaline, muriform, ellipsoid, and measure 50–56 × 20–22.5 μm, without a gelatinous sheath. Pycnidia have not been observed. In standard spot tests the thallus is UV−, C−, K−, KC− and P−. Thin-layer chromatography detects demethylconfluentic and confluentic acid as the main lichen substances.

== Habitat and distribution ==
Cryptothecia demethylconfluentica grows on tree bark in primary (old-growth) rainforest in Parque Nacional Serra de Itabaiana (Sergipe, northeastern Brazil), at around 400 m (1,300 ft) elevation. As of the original publication, it had not been reported from outside Brazil. No additional occurrences were reported up to 2025.
