= 1,2,6-Trigalloylglucose =

- Chemical structure of 1,2,6-trigalloyl glucose

Names
- IUPAC name β-D-Glucopyranose 1,2,6-tris(3,4,5-trihydroxybenzoate)
- Systematic IUPAC name (2S,3R,4S,5S,6R)-4,5-Dihydroxy-6-{[(3,4,5-trihydroxybenzoyl)oxy]methyl}oxane-2,3-diyl bis(3,4,5-trihydroxybenzoate)
- Other names 1,2,6-tris-O-galloyl-β-D-glucose; 1-O,2-O,6-O-Trigalloyl-β-D-glucose; 1,2,6-Tri-O-gallose-β-D-glucopyranose; 1,2,6-Tris-O-(3,4,5-trihydroxybenzoyl)-β-D-glucopyranose

Identifiers
CAS Number	79886-49-0
3D model (JSmol)	Interactive image
ChemSpider	20015942
PubChem CID	440308
UNII	MD4L7VNE2T
CompTox Dashboard (EPA)	DTXSID901000816
- InChI: InChI=1S/C27H24O18/c28-11-1-8(2-12(29)19(11)36)18(35)23(40)25(45-27(43)10-5-15(32)21(38)16(33)6-10)24(41)22(39)17(34)7-44-26(42)9-3-13(30)20(37)14(31)4-9/h1-6,17,22,24-25,28-34,36-39,41H,7H2/t17-,22-,24+,25+/m1/s1 = Key: XVILXNSBQKKWKL-UZLUZJFJSA-N =
- SMILES: O[C@@H]1[C@@H](COC(C2=CC(O)=C(O)C(O)=C2)=O)O[C@@H](OC(C3=CC(O)=C(O)C(O)=C3)=O)[C@H](OC(C4=CC(O)=C(O)C(O)=C4)=O)[C@H]1O

Properties
Chemical formula	C_{27}H_{24}O_{18}
Molar mass	636.471 g·mol^{−1}
- Except where otherwise noted, data are given for materials in their standard state (at 25 °C [77 °F], 100 kPa). verify (what is ?) Infobox references

1,2,6-Trigalloylglucose, or more specifically 1,2,6-tri-O-galloyl-β-D-glucose, is a gallotannin found in cell cultures of Cornus officinalis.

== Biosynthesis ==
The enzyme beta-glucogallin O-galloyltransferase, characterised from oak leaves, converts two units of glucogallin to 1,6-digalloylglucose:

2
Glucogallin
1,6-Digalloylglucose
+
D-glucose

The product 1,6-digalloylglucose can react with another unit of glucogallin to give 1,2,6-trigalloylglucose.
