= Tannase =

Class of enzymes

Identifiers
- EC no.: 3.1.1.20
- CAS no.: 9025-71-2

Databases
- BRENDA: enzyme data
- ExPASy: NiceZyme view
- KEGG: enzyme entry
- MetaCyc: metabolic pathway
- Rhea: reactions
- PDB structures: RCSB PDB PDBe PDBsum
- Gene Ontology: AmiGO / QuickGO
Search
- PMC: articles
- PubMed: articles
- NCBI: proteins

Tannase (EC 3.1.1.20) is an enzyme that catalyzes the reaction:

digallic acid
H_{2}O
2
gallic acid

It is a key enzyme in the degradation of gallotannins and ellagicitannins, two types of hydrolysable tannins. Specifically, tannase catalyzes the hydrolysis of ester and depside bonds of hydrolysable tannins to release glucose and gallic or ellagic acid.

Tannase belongs to the family of hydrolases, specifically those acting on carboxylic ester bonds. The systematic name is tannin acylhydrolase. Other names in common use include tannase S, and tannin acetylhydrolase.

This enzyme has two known domains and one known active site. Tannase can be found in plants, bacteria, and fungi and has different purposes depending on the organism it is found in. Tannase also has many purposes for human use. The production of gallic acid is important in the pharmaceutical industry as it's needed to create trimethoprim, an antibacterial drug. Tannase also has many applications in the food and beverage industry. Specifically, its used to make food and drinks taste better, either by removing turbidity from juices or wines, or removing the bitter taste of tannins in some food and drinks, such as acorn wine. Additionally, because tannase can break ester bonds of glucose with various acids (chebulinic, gallic, and hexahydrophenic), it can be used in the process of fruit ripening.

== Mechanism ==
In addition to catalyzing the hydrolysis of the central ester bond between the two aromatic rings of digallate (depsidase activity), tannase may also have an esterase activity (hydrolysis of terminal ester functional groups that are attached to only one of the two aromatic rings).

Digallate is the conjugate base of digallic acid, but are often used synonymously. Similarly, gallate and gallic acid are used interchangeably. Both digallic and gallic acid are organic acids that are seen in gallotannins and are usually esterified to a glucose molecule. In other words, tannins (which contain digallate/digallic acid) are the natural substrate of tannase. When tannins, specifically gallotannins, are broken down by tannase through the hydrolysis of ester bonds, gallic acid and glucose are formed.

== Structure ==
The crystal structure of tannase varies slightly depending on the strain being observed, in this case we are looking at the tannase SN35N strain produced in Lactobacillus plantarum. On average, its molecular weight is in the range of 50-320 kDa.

=== Domains ===
Tannase from Lactobacillus plantarum has 489 amino acid residues and two domains. The two domains of tannase are called the α/β-hydrolase domain and the lid domain. The α/β-hydrolase domain consists of residues 4-204 and 396-469, and is composed of two nine-stranded β-sheets surrounded by four α-helices on one side and two α-helices on the other side. Conversely, the lid domain consists of residues 205–395 and is composed of seven α-helices and two β-sheets.

=== Active sites ===
There is one known active site in tannase found in the SN35N strain. The crystal structure shows there is a tunnel formed by two opposing domains that can fit the various substrates needed for tannase to hydrolyze. This active site is referred to as the Ser163 active site and is located in the α/β-hydrolase domain. In this active site Ser163, Asp419, and His451 residues form a catalytic triad. If any one of these residues are mutated in the catalytic triad, tannase activity almost always stops.

=== Structure and function ===
One way in which the structure of tannase is tied with its function involves a loop structure, called the flap. The flap connects β8 and β9 sheets and is located under the catalytic triad. As a result of weak electron densities, this structure is very flexible. Due to its flexibility, the flap is better able to guide the substrate in entering the enzyme and helps to strengthen the overall binding of the complex by forming additional interactions with other parts of the substrate.

== Function ==
=== Plants ===
Tannase functions differently in the cell depending on the organism being observed. In many plants, tannase is used to produce tannins, which are found in leaves, wood, and bark. The production of tannins in plants is essential for defense against herbivory, as they cause a strong unpalatable flavor. Tannins are considered secondary metabolites in plants. Therefore, their production by tannase plays no direct role in plant primary metabolism.

=== Microorganisms ===
On the other hand, tannase serves a different purpose in many microorganisms. In the cell, tannase is a key enzyme in the degradation of gallotannins. This is important, because some microorganisms use tannase to breakdown hydrolysable tannins, such as gallotannins, to form glucose and gallic acid. These byproducts are created from the hydroxylation of the aromatic nucleus of the tannin, followed by ring cleavage. Glucose and gallic acid can then be readily converted to metabolites (i.e. pyruvate, succinate, and acetyl coenzyme A) that can be used in the Krebs cycle. Specific microorganisms that utilize tannase in this way include Pseudomonas species.

== Species distribution ==
Tannase is present in a diverse group of microorganisms, including rumen bacteria. Many other bacterial species have been found to produce tannase by being isolated from different types of media such as soil, wastewater, compost, forest litter, feces, beverages, pickles, etc. Bacteria and archaea species with tannase activity have been found in the genera: Achromobacter, Atopobium, Azotobacter, Bacillus, Citrobacter, Corynebacterium, Enterobacter, Enterococcus, Fusobacterium, Gluconoacetobacter, Klebsiella, Lactobacillus, Lonepinella, Methanobrevibacter, Microbacterium, Oenococcus, Pantoea, Pediococcus, Providencia, Pseudomonas, Selenomonad, and Serratia. In addition, some fungal species are dominant tannase producers, such as Aspergilli species.
