= Gallate dioxygenase =

Enzyme

Identifiers
- EC no.: 1.13.11.57

Databases
- IntEnz: IntEnz view
- BRENDA: BRENDA entry
- ExPASy: NiceZyme view
- KEGG: KEGG entry
- MetaCyc: metabolic pathway
- PRIAM: profile
- PDB structures: RCSB PDB PDBe PDBsum
Search
- PMC: articles
- PubMed: articles
- NCBI: proteins

Gallate dioxygenase (EC 1.13.11.57, GalA) is an enzyme with systematic name gallate:oxygen oxidoreductase. This enzyme catalyses the following chemical reaction

gallic acid
O_{2}
4-oxalmesaconic acid

Gallate dioxygenase contains non-heme Fe^{2+}.
