= Pentagalloylglucose =

- Chemical structure of pentagalloylglucose

Names
- IUPAC name β-D-Glucopyranose pentakis(3,4,5-trihydroxybenzoate)
- Systematic IUPAC name (2S,3R,4S,5R,6R)-6-{[(3,4,5-Trihydroxybenzoyl)oxy]methyl}oxane-2,3,4,5-tetrayl tetrakis(3,4,5-trihydroxybenzoate)
- Other names 1,2,3,4,6-Penta-O-galloyl-β-D-glucose; 1,2,3,4,6-Pentakis-O-galloyl-beta-D-glucose beta-Penta-O-galloyl-glucose; PGG; 1,2,3,4,6-Penta-O-galloyl-beta-D-glucose

Identifiers
CAS Number	14937-32-7
3D model (JSmol)	Interactive image
ChEBI	CHEBI:18082
ChEMBL	ChEMBL382408
ChemSpider	58735
ECHA InfoCard	100.113.489
PubChem CID	65238
UNII	3UI3K8W93I
CompTox Dashboard (EPA)	DTXSID901029765
- InChI: InChI=1S/C41H32O26/c42-17-1-12(2-18(43)28(17)52)36(57)62-11-27-33(64-37(58)13-3-19(44)29(53)20(45)4-13)34(65-38(59)14-5-21(46)30(54)22(47)6-14)35(66-39(60)15-7-23(48)31(55)24(49)8-15)41(63-27)67-40(61)16-9-25(50)32(56)26(51)10-16/h1-10,27,33-35,41-56H,11H2/t27-,33-,34+,35-,41+/m1/s1 Key: QJYNZEYHSMRWBK-NIKIMHBISA-N
- SMILES: C1=C(C=C(C(=C1O)O)O)C(=O)OCC2C(C(C(C(O2)OC(=O)C3=CC(=C(C(=C3)O)O)O)OC(=O)C4=CC(=C(C(=C4)O)O)O)OC(=O)C5=CC(=C(C(=C5)O)O)O)OC(=O)C6=CC(=C(C(=C6)O)O)O

Properties
Chemical formula	C_{41}H_{32}O_{26}
Molar mass	940.681 g·mol^{−1}
- Except where otherwise noted, data are given for materials in their standard state (at 25 °C [77 °F], 100 kPa). Infobox references

Pentagalloylglucose, or more specifically 1,2,3,4,6-penta-O-galloyl-β-D-glucose, is the pentagallic acid ester of glucose. It is a gallotannin and the precursor of ellagitannins.

Pentagalloylglucose can precipitate proteins, including human salivary α-amylase.

== Natural occurrence ==
Pentagalloylglucose can be found in Punica granatum (pomegranate), Elaeocarpus sylvestris, Rhus typhina (Staghorn sumac), Paeonia suffruticosa (Tree Peony), Mangifera indica (mango) and Bouea macrophylla Griffith (maprang).

== Biosynthesis ==
The enzyme beta-glucogallin-tetrakisgalloylglucose O-galloyltransferase catalyzes the chemical reaction which transfers the fifth and final gallic acid unit to a central glucose molecule to form pentagalloylglucose.

glucogallin
+
1,2,3,6-tetrakis-O-galloyl-β-D-glucose
glucose
pentagalloylglucose

The enzyme was characterised from oak (Quercus robur).

== Metabolism ==
Tellimagrandin II is formed from pentagalloylglucose by oxidative dehydrogenation and coupling of 2 galloyl groups.

β-glucogallin: 1,2,3,4,6-pentagalloyl-β-D-glucose galloyltransferase is an enzyme found in the leaves of Rhus typhina that catalyzes the galloylation of 1,2,3,4,6-penta-O-galloyl-β-D-glucose to 3-O-digalloyl-1,2,4,6-tetra-O-galloyl-β-D-glucose (hexagalloylglucose).

== Chemistry ==
Pentagalloylglucose can undergo oxidation reactions which are depending on the pH.

== Research ==
Pentagalloylglucose has been studied for its potential use as an antimicrobial, anti-inflammatory, anticarcinogenic, antidiabetic, and antioxidant. It has also been studied for radioprotection. This compound helps stabilize the elastin and collagen in vascular tissues and restores the biomechanical properties of arterial ECM. In addition, pentagalloylglucose has shown to reduce arterial calcification and helps promote extracellular matrix preservation in animal models of abdominal aortic aneurysm. In vitro studies with mouse C2C12 myoblast cells have shown the PGG helps in lowering reactive oxygen species (ROS) and matrix metalloproteinase-2 (MMP-2) expression in a dose-dependent manner.
