= Cryptothecia parvopsoromica =

Scientific classification
- Kingdom: Fungi
- Division: Ascomycota
- Class: Arthoniomycetes
- Order: Arthoniales
- Family: Arthoniaceae
- Genus: Cryptothecia
- Species: C. parvopsoromica

Binomial name
- Cryptothecia parvopsoromica Aptroot (2022)

Species of lichen-forming fungus

Cryptothecia parvopsoromica is a corticolous (bark-dwelling) lichen in the family Arthoniaceae. It is a small crustose lichen that forms whitish-gray patches on tree bark in primary rainforest in central Brazil. It is distinguished by the absence of powdery reproductive structures, the presence of psoromic acid in the thallus, and relatively small multi-chambered ascospores. It was formally described in 2022 from material collected in the Reserva Cristalino region (Mato Grosso) and remains known only from Brazil.

== Taxonomy ==
Cryptothecia parvopsoromica was described in 2022 by André Aptroot from material collected on tree bark in primary rainforest in the Reserva Cristalino, Mato Grosso, Brazil, at an elevation of 250–350 m (820–1,150 ft). The holotype (A. Aptroot 82383) is deposited in the herbarium of the Federal University of Mato Grosso do Sul (CGMS). Within Cryptothecia, it is characterized by a whitish gray thallus that lacks soredia, and by hyaline muriform ascospores. The spores are broadly club-shaped, measure 15–18 × 6.5–7.5 μm, and show 10–13 lumina in optical view (6–7 transverse septa and 0–2 longitudinal septa). The thallus chemistry, dominated by psoromic acid, also separates C. parvopsoromica from others in keys to the genus. The specific epithet refers to the small ascospores and the presence of psoromic acid in the thallus.

== Description ==
The thallus is crustose and continuous, forming a dull, whitish gray patch up to 8 cm (3 in) across while remaining under 0.1 mm thick. It lacks a cortex and soredia and is not bordered by a distinct prothallus. The photobiont is trentepohlioid (in the green-algal genus Trentepohlia). Ascigerous areas are whitish, irregular to oval, somewhat convex, 0.3–0.8 × 0.3–0.5 mm, and slightly raised above the thallus surface. No true apothecia are formed, because the interascal filaments are not differentiated from thallus hyphae. The asci are visible to the naked eye as ochraceous dots. They occur in groups of about 3–10 within the ascigerous areas and are club-shaped, 38–42 × 18–20.5 μm. Ascospores are produced eight per ascus. They are hyaline (colorless), muriform, and broadly club-shaped, measuring 15–18 × 6.5–7.5 μm. In optical view they show 10–13 lumina (6–7 × 0–2 septa), are IKI-negative, and lack a gelatinous sheath. Pycnidia have not been observed. In standard spot tests the thallus is UV−, C−, K−, KC− and P+ yellow. Thin-layer chromatography detects psoromic acid as the main lichen substance.

== Habitat and distribution ==
Cryptothecia parvopsoromica grows on tree bark in primary rain forest in the Reserva Cristalino region (Mato Grosso, Brazil), at about 250 and 350 m (820 and 1,150 ft) elevation. As of the original publication, it had not been reported from outside Brazil. No additional occurrences were reported up to 2025.
