= 1,6-Digalloylglucose =

Names
- IUPAC name β-D-Glucopyranose 1,6-bis(3,4,5-trihydroxybenzoate)
- Systematic IUPAC name (2S,3R,4S,5S,6R)-3,4,5-Trihydroxy-6-{[(3,4,5-trihydroxybenzoyl)oxy]methyl}oxan-2-yl 3,4,5-trihydroxybenzoate
- Other names Digalloyl glucose

Identifiers
CAS Number	23363-08-8
3D model (JSmol)	Interactive image
ChEBI	CHEBI:15723
ChEMBL	ChEMBL522251
ChemSpider	389206
KEGG	C04101
PubChem CID	440221
CompTox Dashboard (EPA)	DTXSID301045329
- InChI: InChI=1S/C20H20O14/c21-8-1-6(2-9(22)13(8)25)18(30)32-5-12-15(27)16(28)17(29)20(33-12)34-19(31)7-3-10(23)14(26)11(24)4-7/h1-4,12,15-17,20-29H,5H2/t12-,15-,16+,17-,20+/m1/s1 Key: LYGRISUQIZNHGM-IVABAYMNSA-N; InChI=1/C20H20O14/c21-8-1-6(2-9(22)13(8)25)18(30)32-5-12-15(27)16(28)17(29)20(33-12)34-19(31)7-3-10(23)14(26)11(24)4-7/h1-4,12,15-17,20-29H,5H2/t12-,15-,16+,17-,20+/m1/s1 Key: LYGRISUQIZNHGM-IVABAYMNBE
- SMILES: C1=C(C=C(C(=C1O)O)O)C(=O)OC[C@@H]2[C@H]([C@@H]([C@H]([C@@H](O2)OC(=O)C3=CC(=C(C(=C3)O)O)O)O)O)O

Properties
Chemical formula	C_{20}H_{20}O_{14}
Molar mass	484.366 g·mol^{−1}
- Except where otherwise noted, data are given for materials in their standard state (at 25 °C [77 °F], 100 kPa). Infobox references

1,6-Digalloylglucose, or more specifically 1,6-di-O-galloyl-β-D-glucose, is a gallotannin. It can be found in some oak species.

== Biosynthesis ==
The enzyme beta-glucogallin O-galloyltransferase, characterised from oak, produces 1,6-digalloylglucose from two units of glucogallin:

2
Glucogallin
1,6-Digalloylglucose
+
D-glucose

1,6-digalloylglucose can then be converted into 1,2,6-trigalloylglucose, another gallotannin.
