= Beta-glucogallin O-galloyltransferase =

Enzyme in a chemical reaction

Identifiers
- EC no.: 2.3.1.90
- CAS no.: 87502-55-4

Databases
- IntEnz: IntEnz view
- BRENDA: BRENDA entry
- ExPASy: NiceZyme view
- KEGG: KEGG entry
- MetaCyc: metabolic pathway
- PRIAM: profile
- PDB structures: RCSB PDB PDBe PDBsum
- Gene Ontology: AmiGO / QuickGO
Search
- PMC: articles
- PubMed: articles
- NCBI: proteins

Beta-glucogallin O-galloyltransferase (EC 2.3.1.90) is an enzyme that catalyzes the chemical reaction

2
Glucogallin
1,6-Digalloylglucose
+
D-glucose

The enzyme has one substrate, glucogallin. Two units of this are converted to one of 1,6-digalloylglucose and one of D-glucose. The product 1,6-digalloylglucose can react with another unit of glucogallin to give 1,2,6-trigalloylglucose.

This enzyme, characterised from oak leaves, belongs to the family of transferases, specifically those acyltransferases transferring groups other than aminoacyl groups. The systematic name of this enzyme class is 1-O-galloyl-beta-D-glucose:1-O-galloyl-beta-D-glucose O-galloyltransferase.
