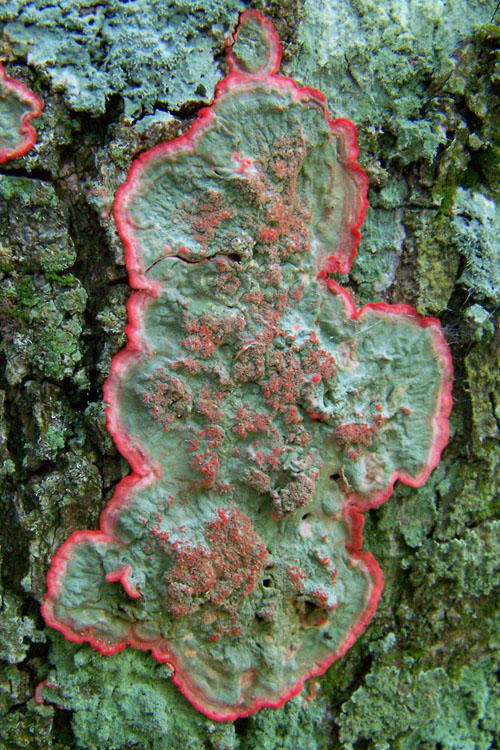
- Cryptothecia sp. growing on a tree in Chaco Province, northern Argentina

Scientific classification
- Kingdom: Fungi
- Division: Ascomycota
- Class: Arthoniomycetes
- Order: Arthoniales
- Family: Arthoniaceae
- Genus: Cryptothecia; Stirt. (1876)

Type species
- Cryptothecia subnidulans Stirt. (1876)

Species
- See text

Synonyms
- Herpothallonomyces Cif. & Tomas. (1954); Myxotheca Ferd. & Winge (1910)

= Cryptothecia =

Genus of lichens

Cryptothecia is a genus of white to greenish crustose lichens that grow on bark, wood, or leaves, in tropical or subtropical areas worldwide. It has a conspicuous prothallus that develops around its periphery which can be bright red in some species, hence the common name wreath lichen. The main vegetative body (thallus) lacks a cortex (ecorticate and is often immersed in the substrate or byssoid (whispy, like teased wool). The medulla is white, well defined, and often peppered with calcium oxalate crystals. Ascomata are not well defined, being cushions of soft white mycelium immersed in the medullary tissue, hence the name from the Greek krypto = "to conceal" and theke = "a container or sheath". It contains Trentepohlia, a green alga, as its photobiont partner.

Two species have been described in North America. At least one species, Cryptothecia rubrocincta, has been used in Brazil as a source of dye.

== Taxonomy ==
The genus was circumscribed by James Stirton in 1877, with Cryptothecia subnidulans assigned as the type species.

== Description ==
Species in the genus Cryptothecia have a crustose thallus, which can be either immersed in the substrate or its surface. The colour of the thallus ranges from white to greenish, often with a byssoid (cottony) texture. Some species have spherical isidia-like granules, although soredia are absent. The prothallus typically consists of interwoven or radiating hyphae, and the photobiont layer may be either distinct or indistinct. The medulla is usually well-defined, white, and frequently amyloid, often containing numerous colourless calcium oxalate crystals.

Cryptothecia does not have well-defined ascomata (fruiting bodies). Its ascigerous areas, which can be common or rare, are restricted to cushions of soft white mycelium within the loose medullary tissue. These areas tend to spread over the whole thallus, forming small clusters near the surface or cushion-like structures. Asci are spherical to ovoid, bitunicate, and thick-walled, typically measuring 60–160 by 30–130 μm. They are enclosed in a cocoon-like layer and contain 1–8 spores. The ascospores are muriform, ellipsoidal, and often somewhat curved, ranging from 40–110 by 15–65 μm in size.

Conidiomata in Cryptothecia are pycnidial and range from immersed in the substrate to emergent, with a dark brown wall. Conidiogenous cells are simple, and bacilliform (rod-shaped) to narrowly clavate (club-shaped_. The conidia are colourless, simple, bacilliform, and range from 3–8 by about 1 μm, or they can be thread-like, filiform (threadlike), and multiseptate, measuring 110–140 by about 1.5 μm.

== Species ==
As of November 2025, Species Fungorum (in the Catalogue of Life) accepts 53 species of Cryptothecia.

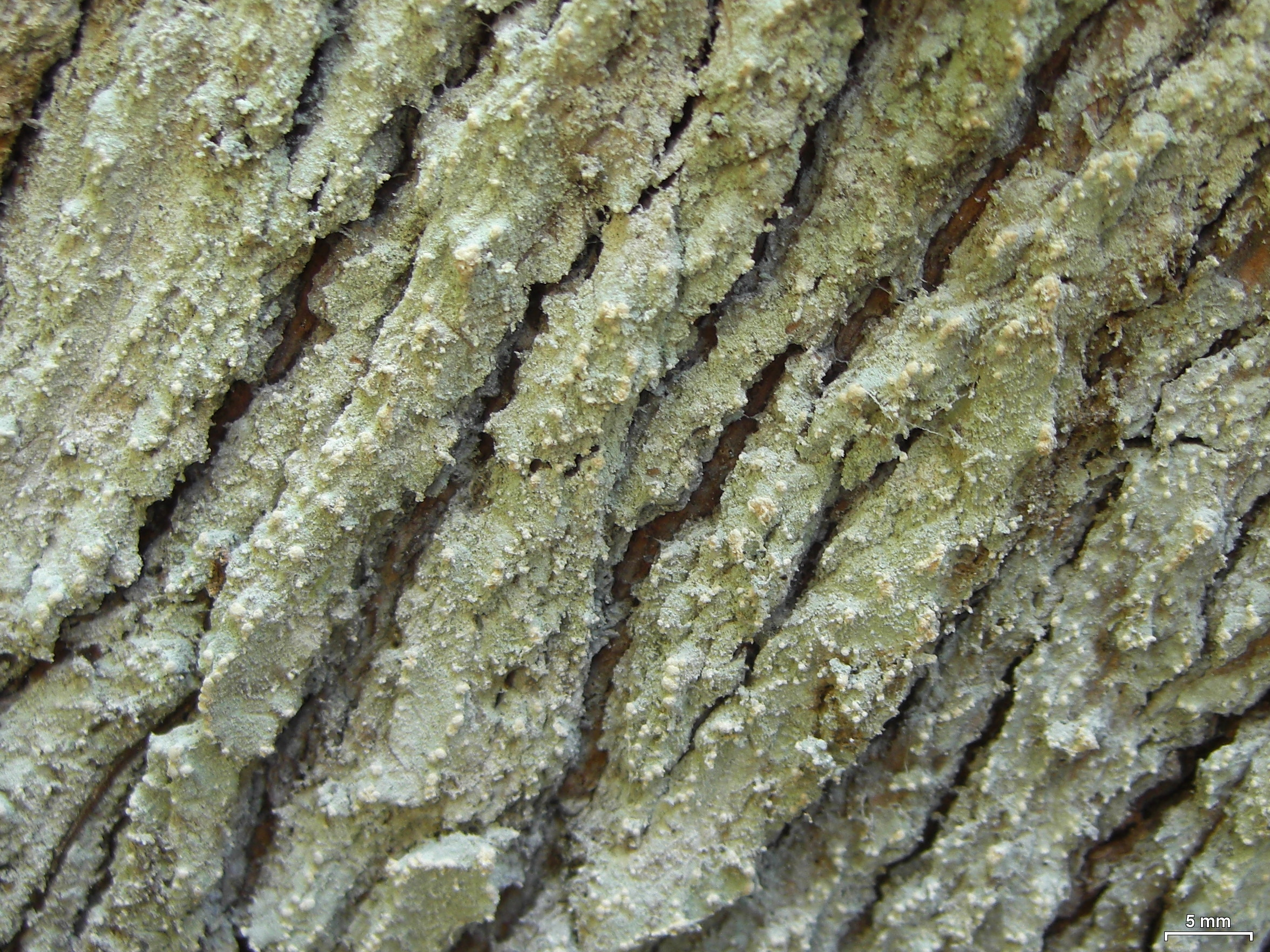
Cryptothecia punctosorediata

- Cryptothecia alboglauca Jagad. Ram, G.P.Sinha & Kr.P.Singh (2009) – India
- Cryptothecia albomaculans Jagadeesh & G.P.Sinha (2016)
- Cryptothecia albomaculatella Aptroot & Wolseley (2009) – Thailand
- Cryptothecia aleurinoides Aptroot & Wolseley (2009) – Thailand
- Cryptothecia atropunctata G.Thor (1997)
- Cryptothecia austrocoreana J.J.Woo, Lőkös, Farkas & Hur (2017)
- Cryptothecia bengalensis Jagad.Ram, G.P.Sinha & Kr.P.Singh (2009) – India
- Cryptothecia calusarum Seavey & J.Seavey (2017) – USA
- Cryptothecia chamelensis Herrera-Camp., Bautista & Lücking (2019) – Mexico
- Cryptothecia darwiniana Bungartz & Elix (2013) – Galápagos Islands
- Cryptothecia demethylconfluentica Aptroot (2022) – Brazil
- Cryptothecia duplofluorescens Aptroot & M.F.Souza (2021) – Brazil
- Cryptothecia elata Jagadeesh & G.P.Sinha (2016)
- Cryptothecia elongata Jagadeesh & G.P.Sinha (2016)
- Cryptothecia eungellae G.Thor (1997)
- Cryptothecia evergladensis Seavey (2009)
- Cryptothecia exilis G.Thor (1997)
- Cryptothecia fabispora M.Cáceres, E.L.Lima & Aptroot (2013) – Brazil
- Cryptothecia farinosa Jagad.Ram, G.P.Sinha & Kr.P.Singh (2009) – India
- Cryptothecia fuscopunctata Seavey & J.Seavey (2014)
- Cryptothecia galapagoana Bungartz & Elix (2013) – Galápagos Islands
- Cryptothecia inexspectata G.Thor (1997)
- Cryptothecia isidioxantha Aptroot & M.Cáceres (2017)
- Cryptothecia lecanorosorediata Aptroot & M.Cáceres (2024) – Brazil
- Cryptothecia lichexanthonica E.L.Lima, Aptroot & M.Cáceres (2013) – Brazil
- Cryptothecia macrocephala M.Cáceres & Aptroot (2013) – Brazil
- Cryptothecia methylmicrophyllinica Aptroot & Spier (2010)
- Cryptothecia methylperlatolica Aptroot (2022) – Brazil
- Cryptothecia multipunctata Jagad.Ram, G.P.Sinha & Kr.P.Singh (2009) – India
- Cryptothecia odishensis R.Bajpai, S.Joseph & Upreti (2018) – India
- Cryptothecia parvopsoromica Aptroot (2022) – Brazil
- Cryptothecia punctosorediata Sparrius (2005)
- Cryptothecia randallii Seavey & J.Seavey (2017) – USA
- Cryptothecia rhizophora Aptroot & M.Cáceres (2016) – Brazil
- Cryptothecia rosae-iselae Flakus & Kukwa (2015) – Bolivia
- Cryptothecia scripta G.Thor (1997)
- Cryptothecia stockerae G.Neuwirth & Aptroot (2016) – Seychelles
- Cryptothecia submacrocephala Seavey & J.Seavey (2017) – USA
- Cryptothecia subnidulans Stirt. (1876)
- Cryptothecia superphyllinica Jagadeesh & G.P.Sinha (2016)
- Cryptothecia verruculifera Jagad.Ram, G.P.Sinha & Kr.P.Singh (2009) – India
