= Cryptothecia lichexanthonica =

Scientific classification
- Domain: Eukaryota
- Kingdom: Fungi
- Division: Ascomycota
- Class: Arthoniomycetes
- Order: Arthoniales
- Family: Arthoniaceae
- Genus: Cryptothecia
- Species: C. lichexanthonica

Binomial name
- Cryptothecia lichexanthonica E.L.Lima, Aptroot & M.Cáceres (2013)

Species of lichen

Cryptothecia lichexanthonica is a species of corticolous (bark-dwelling) lichen in the family Arthoniaceae. Found in Brazil, it was formally described as a new species in 2013 by Edvaneide Leandro de Lima, André Aptroot, and Marcela Eugenia da Silva Cáceres. The type specimen was collected by Lima from the Vale do Catimbau National Park (Buíque, Pernambuco), at an altitude of 885 m (2,904 ft); here it was found growing on smooth tree bark. The lichen has a smooth, pale greenish-grey spreading thallus up to 5 cm (2 in) in diameter. The thallus, which is 0.1–0.2 mm thick, is surrounded by a thin (about 0.3–0.6 mm) brown hypothallus. The ascospores are muriform (sectioned into more or less equal chambers), ellipsoid in shape, and measure 55–75 by 22–28 μm. The specific epithet lichexanthonica refers to lichexanthone, a secondary chemical that occurs in the thallus. This compound is rare in the genus Cryptothecia, as the only other congener in which it known is to occur is Cryptothecia assimilis.
