= Cryptothecia evergladensis =

Scientific classification
- Domain: Eukaryota
- Kingdom: Fungi
- Division: Ascomycota
- Class: Arthoniomycetes
- Order: Arthoniales
- Family: Arthoniaceae
- Genus: Cryptothecia
- Species: C. evergladensis

Binomial name
- Cryptothecia evergladensis Seavey (2009)

Species of lichen

Cryptothecia evergladensis is a species of corticolous (bark-dwelling) and crustose lichen in the family Arthoniaceae. Found in Florida, USA, it was formally described by lichenologist Frederick Seavey in 2009. The type specimen was collected by Seavey in Everglades National Park in a cypress strand. The specific epithet refers to the type locality. The lichen is most often encountered on the bark on Taxodium, but has also been recorded growing on Metopium toxiferum, Sideroxylon salicifolia, Ateramnus lucida, and Lysiloma latisiliquum, and well as on the wood of Conocarpus erectus. Cryptothecia evergladensis contains some secondary compounds, including psoromic acid, 2-O-methylperlatolic acid, and lichexanthone. The last compound, when present in the lichen at sufficient amounts, causes the lichen thallus to fluoresce yellow when shone with a long-wavelength UV light.
