= Gallate 1-beta-glucosyltransferase =

Class of enzymes

Identifiers
- EC no.: 2.4.1.136
- CAS no.: 89700-30-1

Databases
- IntEnz: IntEnz view
- BRENDA: BRENDA entry
- ExPASy: NiceZyme view
- KEGG: KEGG entry
- MetaCyc: metabolic pathway
- PRIAM: profile
- PDB structures: RCSB PDB PDBe PDBsum
- Gene Ontology: AmiGO / QuickGO
Search
- PMC: articles
- PubMed: articles
- NCBI: proteins

Gallate 1-beta-glucosyltransferase (EC 2.4.1.136) is an enzyme that catalyzes the chemical reaction

gallic acid
+ UDP-glucose
glucogallin

The two substrates of this enzyme characterised from oak leaves are gallic acid and UDP-glucose. Its products are glucogallin and uridine diphosphate (UDP).

This enzyme belongs to the family of glycosyltransferases, specifically the hexosyltransferases. The systematic name of this enzyme class is UDP-glucose:gallate beta-D-glucosyltransferase. Other names in common use include UDP-glucose-vanillate 1-glucosyltransferase, UDPglucose:vanillate 1-O-glucosyltransferase, and UDPglucose:gallate glucosyltransferase.
