= Pieter Groenhart =

Dutch lichenologist (1894–1965)

Pieter Groenhart (21 February 1894 – 3 November 1965) was a Dutch lichenologist known for his research into tropical Asian lichens. After beginning his career as a teacher in the Netherlands, he relocated to the Dutch East Indies (present-day Indonesia) in 1926, where he taught while developing his expertise in lichenology. During World War II, he was interned by Japanese forces for three years, suffering health consequences including vision impairment. Following the war, he worked at the Rijksherbarium in the Netherlands and later at the Herbarium Bogoriense in Indonesia until 1954. Groenhart's scientific contributions included significant research on the genus Cryptothecia and pioneering work addressing fundamental problems in lichen taxonomy. His personal collection of about 8,000 lichen specimens was incorporated into the Rijksherbarium, and several lichen species were named in his honour in recognition of his contributions to the field.

== Early life and career ==
Born in Ilpendam, a small village north of Amsterdam, Groenhart became a teacher in 1916 and taught in several elementary schools in the Netherlands. In August 1926, he relocated to the Dutch East Indies (present-day Indonesia), initially receiving a temporary appointment in Batavia (now Jakarta). Shortly thereafter, he moved to Malang in East Java, where he taught at the Agricultural School from November 1926 to September 1932.

Seeking to advance his scientific knowledge, Groenhart obtained leave to study biology at the University of Utrecht from October 1932 to July 1935. He then specialized in lichenology at the Rijksherbarium in Leiden from July 1935 to May 1936, acquiring expertise that would define his future career.

== Career in Indonesia ==
After completing his studies, Groenhart returned to his teaching position in Malang until March 1940, when he was transferred to a higher-grade Government school in [Buitenzorg (now Bogor). At this new posting, he was permitted to dedicate one day per week to lichenological research at the herbarium of the botanical garden.

Groenhart's scientific work was interrupted in March 1942 when Japanese forces occupied the Dutch East Indies. Along with many other Dutch citizens, he was interned in June 1942. During his three years of captivity, he demonstrated remarkable resilience by conducting lectures on elementary biology for fellow prisoners, helping maintain morale under difficult conditions. When released in August 1945, he had suffered severe health consequences, including vision impairment due to vitamin deficiency, though his determination remained undiminished. After returning to the Netherlands, he continued his studies of lichens, becoming especially interested in the genus Cryptothecia.

== Post-war career ==
Following the war, Groenhart was commissioned to resume his lichenological studies. He returned to the Netherlands, working at the Rijksherbarium from March 1946 to October 1947, examining collections of Malesian lichens. Financial constraints led him to seek employment again in the East Indies, where he was appointed lichenologist at the herbarium in Buitenzorg (October 1947–August 1951).

Despite political changes following Indonesian independence, Groenhart successfully maintained his position as "Botanist 1st Class at the Herbarium Bogoriense of the Kebun Raya Indonesia" under the new Indonesian administration from September 1951 to December 1954. These final years in Indonesia proved challenging, but his deep attachment to Java made his eventual departure in January 1955 particularly difficult.

Upon returning to the Netherlands, Groenhart settled near Leiden. His substantial personal collection of approximately 8,000 lichen specimens was incorporated into the Rijksherbarium, and he devoted himself to organizing and labeling these materials.

== Scientific contributions ==
Groenhart's research focused particularly on tropical Asian lichens. In his later career, he developed a special interest in the genus Cryptothecia, which fascinated him due to its unusual reproductive structures—instead of bearing recognizable fructifications, these lichens have solitary asci or clusters of asci distributed throughout the thallus. With financial support from "The Netherlands Organisation for the Advancement of Pure Research (Z.W.O.)," he undertook a revision of the family Cryptotheciaceae.

Although he was unable to complete this revision, his preliminary studies yielded valuable insights that revealed fundamental problems in lichen taxonomy, particularly its failure to incorporate modern mycological concepts. This realization required Groenhart to undertake a comprehensive reorientation in mycological literature—a remarkable intellectual achievement given his age at the time.

== Legacy and character ==
Remembered fondly by both students and colleagues, Groenhart was known for his outstanding teaching abilities, gentle disposition, and remarkable perseverance. His career exemplified dedication to scientific inquiry despite significant personal hardships and historical upheavals.

Species named in his honour include Ocellularia groenhartii (Hale 1975), Cryptothecia groenhartii (Makhija & Patw. 1994), and Rinodina groenhartii (H.Mayrhofer 1984).

== Selected publications ==
- Groenhart, P. (1936). "Beitrage zur Kenntnis der javanischen Flechten I—III." Ned. kruidk. Arch. 46: 690–784.
- Groenhart, P. (1938). "Eenige Cryptotheciaceae van Java." Natuurk. Tijdschr. Ned.-Ind. 98: 304–310.
- Groenhart, P. (1941). "Malaysian lichens. I". Bull. bot. Gdns, Buitenzorg, ser. 3 17: 198–203.
- Groenhart, P. (1950). "Malaysian lichens—II". Reinwardtia 1: 33–39.
- Groenhart, P. (1954). "Malaysian lichens—IV". Reinwardtia 2: 385–402.
- Groenhart, P. (1962). "Agaothecium Groenh., a new lichen genus from Malaysia". Persoonia 2: 349–353.
- Groenhart, P. (1965). "Studies in ascostromatic lichen-fungi. I. The problem of Ascohymeniales and Ascoloculares". Persoonia 4 (1): 1–7.
- Groenhart, P. (1965). "Studies in ascostromatic lichen-fungi. II. Types of ascostromata". Persoonia 4 (1): 9–13.

== See also ==
- Category:Taxa named by Pieter Groenhart
- List of mycologists
