= Gallotannin =

Class of chemical compounds

A gallotannin is any of a class of molecules belonging to the hydrolysable tannins. Gallotannins are polymers formed when gallic acid, a polyphenol monomer, esterifies and binds with the hydroxyl group of a polyol carbohydrate such as glucose.

== Metabolism ==
Gallate 1-beta-glucosyltransferase uses UDP-glucose and gallate to produce UDP and 1-galloyl-β-D-glucose. Beta-glucogallin O-galloyltransferase uses 1-O-galloyl-β-D-glucose to produce D-glucose and 1-O,6-O-digalloyl-β-D-glucose. Beta-glucogallin-tetrakisgalloylglucose O-galloyltransferase uses 1-O-galloyl-β-D-glucose and 1,2,3,6-tetrakis-O-galloyl-β-D-glucose to produce D-glucose and 1,2,3,4,6-pentakis-O-galloyl-β-D-glucose (1,2,3,4,6-penta-O-galloyl-β-D-glucose, the common precursor of gallotannins and the related ellagitannins).

Tannase is a key enzyme in the degradation of gallotannins that uses digallic acid and H_{2}O to produce gallic acid.

== See also ==
- List of antioxidants in food
