= Depside =

Class of chemical compounds

Evernic acid, a depside

A depside is a type of polyphenolic compound composed of two or more monocyclic aromatic units linked by an ester group. Depsides are most often found in lichens, but have also been isolated from higher plants, including species of the Ericaceae, Lamiaceae, Papaveraceae and Myrtaceae. In lichens, depsides are polyketide-derived secondary metabolites biosynthesized via the polymalonate pathway. Most lichen depsides occur in the medulla, and their chemistry was historically used as a species-level character in lichen taxonomy, although molecular methods have since changed how such variation is interpreted.

Certain depsides have antibiotic, anti-HIV, antioxidant, and anti-proliferative activity in vitro. As inhibitors of prostaglandin synthesis and leukotriene B_{4} biosynthesis, some depsides have in vitro anti-inflammatory activity. However, this research is still dominated by in vitro work, with fewer in vivo studies, and no clinical trials had been reported in a 2023 review.

A depsidase is a type of enzyme that cuts depside bonds. One such enzyme is tannase.

== Examples ==
Gyrophoric acid, found in the lichen Cryptothecia rubrocincta, is a depside. Merochlorophaeic acid, isolated from lichens of the genus Cladonia, is an inhibitor of prostaglandin synthesis.

Some depsides are described as anti-HIV.
