= Gallic acid =

3,4,5-Trihydroxybenzoic acid

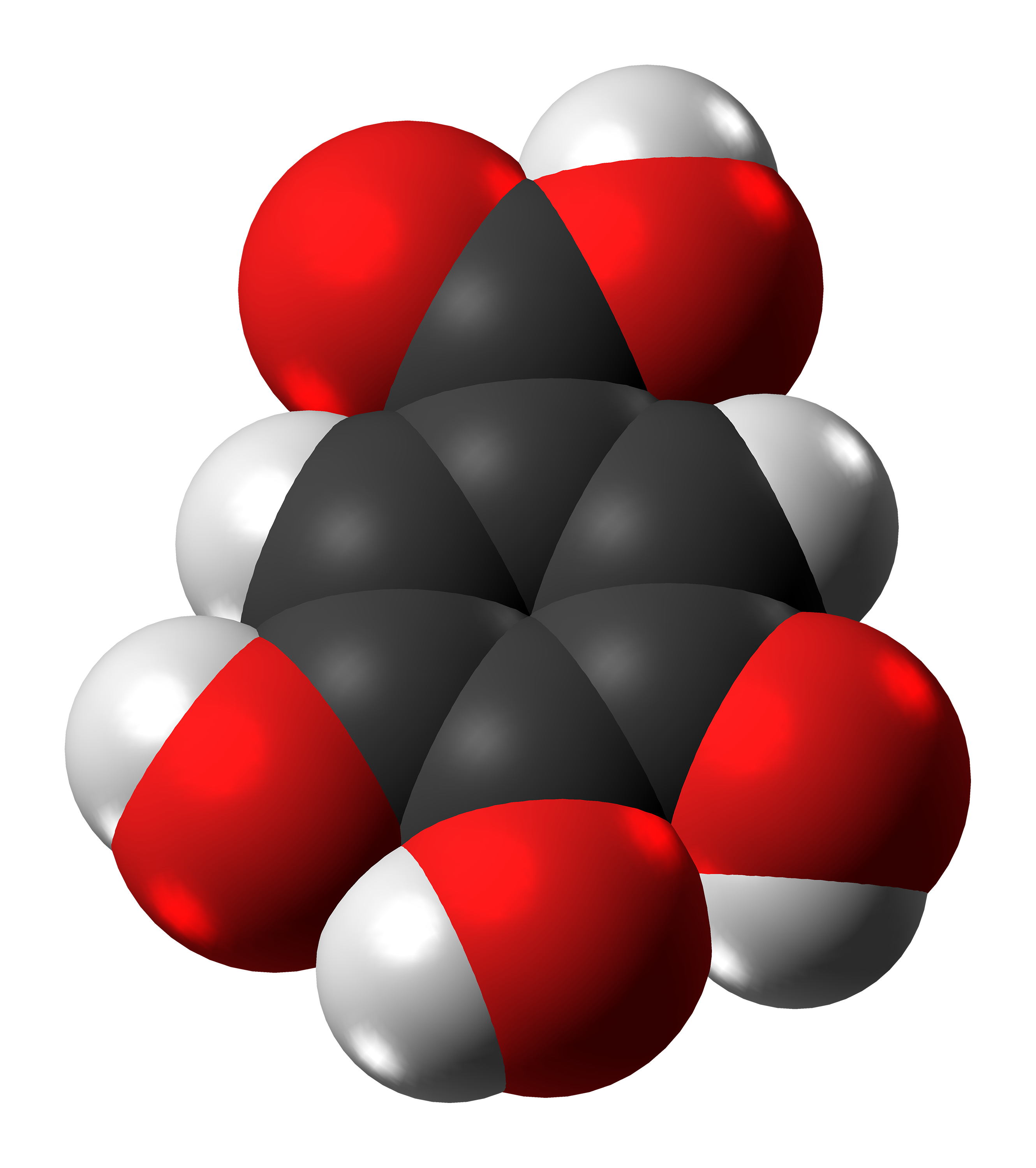

Names
- Preferred IUPAC name 3,4,5-Trihydroxybenzoic acid
- Other names Gallic acid

Identifiers
CAS Number	149-91-7; 5995-86-8 (monohydrate)
3D model (JSmol)	Interactive image
ChEBI	CHEBI:30778
ChEMBL	ChEMBL288114
ChemSpider	361
ECHA InfoCard	100.005.228
EC Number	205-749-9
IUPHAR/BPS	5549
KEGG	C01424
PubChem CID	370
RTECS number	LW7525000
UNII	632XD903SP; 48339473OT (monohydrate)
CompTox Dashboard (EPA)	DTXSID0020650
- InChI: InChI=1S/C7H6O5/c8-4-1-3(7(11)12)2-5(9)6(4)10/h1-2,8-10H,(H,11,12) Key: LNTHITQWFMADLM-UHFFFAOYSA-N; InChI=1/C7H6O5/c8-4-1-3(7(11)12)2-5(9)6(4)10/h1-2,8-10H,(H,11,12) Key: LNTHITQWFMADLM-UHFFFAOYAN
- SMILES: O=C(O)c1cc(O)c(O)c(O)c1

Properties
Chemical formula	C_{7}H_{6}O_{5}
Molar mass	170.12 g/mol
Appearance	White, yellowish-white, or pale fawn-colored crystals.
Density	1.694 g/cm^{3} (anhydrous)
Melting point	260 °C (500 °F; 533 K)
Solubility in water	1.19 g/100 mL, 20°C (anhydrous); 1.5 g/100 mL, 20 °C (monohydrate)
Solubility	soluble in alcohol, ether, glycerol, acetone negligible in benzene, chloroform, petroleum ether
log P	0.70
Acidity (pK_{a})	COOH: 4.5, OH: 10.
Magnetic susceptibility (χ)	−90.0·10^{−6} cm^{3}/mol

Hazards
- Occupational safety and health (OHS/OSH)
Main hazards	Irritant
NFPA 704 (fire diamond)	1 0
- Lethal dose or concentration (LD, LC)
LD_{50} (median dose)	5000 mg/kg (rabbit, oral)
Safety data sheet (SDS)	External MSDS

Related compounds
Related	phenols, carboxylic acids
Related compounds	Benzoic acid, Phenol, Pyrogallol
- Except where otherwise noted, data are given for materials in their standard state (at 25 °C [77 °F], 100 kPa). verify (what is ?) Infobox references

Gallic acid (also known as 3,4,5-trihydroxybenzoic acid) is a trihydroxybenzoic acid with the formula C_{6}H_{2}(OH)_{3}CO_{2}H. It is classified as a phenolic acid. It is found in gallnuts, sumac, witch hazel, tea leaves, oak bark, and other plants. It is a white solid, although samples are typically brown owing to partial oxidation. Salts and esters of gallic acid are termed "gallates".

Its name is derived from oak galls, which were historically used to prepare tannic acid. Despite the name, gallic acid does not contain gallium.

== Isolation and derivatives ==
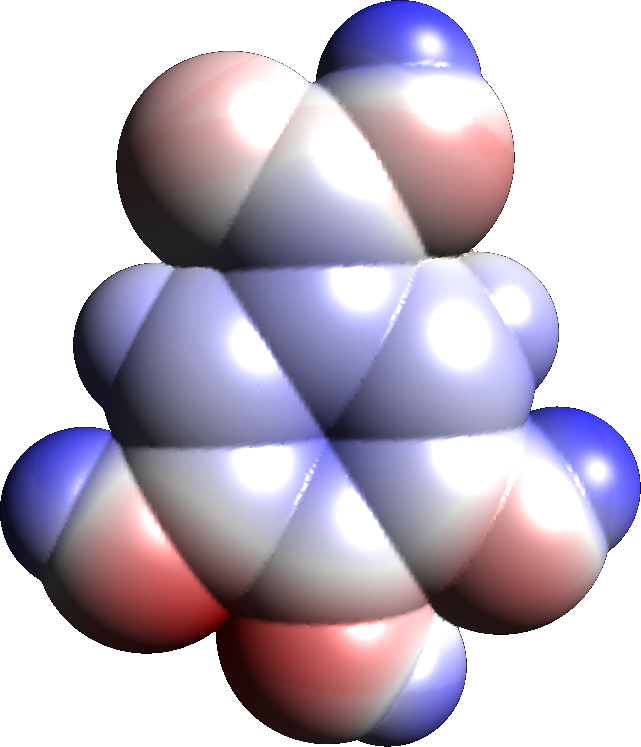
Electrostatic potential map of surface of gallic acid molecule

Ellagic acid molecule structure resembles that of two gallic acid molecules assembled in head to tail position and linked together by a C–C bond (as in biphenyl) and two cyclic ester links (lactones) forming two additional 6-piece cycles.

Gallic acid is easily freed from gallotannins by acidic or alkaline hydrolysis. When heated with concentrated sulfuric acid, gallic acid converts to rufigallol.

=== Biosynthesis ===
Chemical structure of 3,5-didehydroshikimate

Gallic acid is formed from 3-dehydroshikimate by the action of the enzyme shikimate dehydrogenase to produce 3,5-didehydroshikimate. This latter compound aromatizes.

=== Reactions ===
==== Oxidation and oxidative coupling ====
Alkaline solutions of gallic acid are readily oxidized by air. The oxidation is catalyzed by the enzyme gallate dioxygenase, an enzyme found in Pseudomonas putida.

Oxidative coupling of gallic acid with arsenic acid, permanganate, persulfate, or iodine yields ellagic acid, as does reaction of methyl gallate with iron(III) chloride. Gallic acid forms intermolecular esters (depsides) such as digallic and cyclic ether-esters (depsidones).

==== Hydrogenation ====
Hydrogenation of gallic acid gives the cyclohexane derivative hexahydrogallic acid.

==== Decarboxylation ====
Heating gallic acid gives pyrogallol (1,2,3-trihydroxybenzene). This conversion is catalyzed by gallate decarboxylase.

==== Esterification ====
Many esters of gallic acid are known, both synthetic and natural. Gallate 1-beta-glucosyltransferase catalyzes the glycosylation (attachment of glucose) of gallic acid.

== Historical context and uses ==
Gallic acid is an important component of iron gall ink, the standard European writing and drawing ink from the 12th to 19th centuries, with a history extending to the Roman empire and the Dead Sea Scrolls. Pliny the Elder (23–79 AD) describes the use of gallic acid as a means of detecting an adulteration of verdigris and writes that it was used to produce dyes. Galls (also known as oak apples) from oak trees were crushed and mixed with water, producing tannic acid. It could then be mixed with green vitriol (ferrous sulfate)—obtained by allowing sulfate-saturated water from a spring or mine drainage to evaporate—and gum arabic from acacia trees; this combination of ingredients produced the ink.

Gallic acid was one of the substances used by Angelo Mai (1782–1854), among other early investigators of palimpsests, to clear the top layer of text off and reveal hidden manuscripts underneath. Mai was the first to employ it, but did so "with a heavy hand", often rendering manuscripts too damaged for subsequent study by other researchers.

Gallic acid was first studied by the Swedish chemist Carl Wilhelm Scheele in 1786. In 1818, French chemist and pharmacist Henri Braconnot (1780–1855) devised a simpler method of purifying gallic acid from galls; gallic acid was also studied by the French chemist Théophile-Jules Pelouze (1807–1867), among others.

When mixed with acetic acid, gallic acid had uses in early types of photography, like the calotype to make the silver more sensitive to light; it was also used in developing photographs.

== Occurrence ==
Gallic acid is found in a number of land plants, such as the parasitic plant Cynomorium coccineum, the aquatic plant Myriophyllum spicatum, and the blue-green alga Microcystis aeruginosa. Gallic acid is also found in various oak species, Caesalpinia mimosoides, and in the stem bark of Boswellia dalzielii, among others. Many foodstuffs contain various amounts of gallic acid, especially fruits (including strawberries, grapes, bananas), as well as teas, cloves, and vinegars. Carob fruit is a rich source of gallic acid (24–165 mg per 100 g).

== Esters ==
Also known as galloylated esters:

- Methyl gallate
- Ethyl gallate, a food additive with E number E313
- Propyl gallate, or propyl 3,4,5-trihydroxybenzoate, an ester formed by the condensation of gallic acid and propanol
- Octyl gallate, the ester of octanol and gallic acid
- Dodecyl gallate, or lauryl gallate, the ester of dodecanol and gallic acid
- Epicatechin gallate, a flavan-3-ol, a type of flavonoid, present in green tea
- Epigallocatechin gallate (EGCG), also known as epigallocatechin 3-gallate, the ester of epigallocatechin and gallic acid, and a type of catechin
- Gallocatechin gallate (GCG), the ester of gallocatechin and gallic acid and a type of flavan-3ol
- Theaflavin-3-gallate, a theaflavin derivative

Gallate esters are antioxidants useful in food preservation, with propyl gallate being the most commonly used. Their use in human health is scantly supported by evidence.

== Spectral data ==
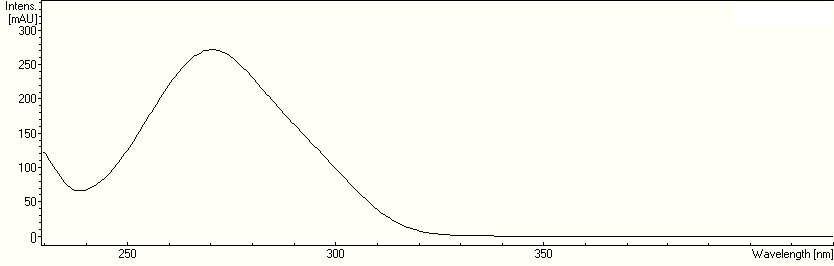
UV-Vis
Lambda-max:	220, 271 nm (ethanol) Spectrum of gallic acid
Extinction coefficient (log ε)
IR
Major absorption bands	ν : 3491, 3377, 1703, 1617, 1539, 1453, 1254 cm^{−1} (KBr)
NMR
Proton NMR (acetone-d6): d : doublet, dd : doublet of doublets, m : multiplet, s : singlet	δ : 7.15 (2H, s, H-3 and H-7)
Carbon-13 NMR (acetone-d6):	δ : 167.39 (C-1), 144.94 (C-4 and C-6), 137.77 (C-5), 120.81 (C-2), 109.14 (C-3 and C-7)
Other NMR data
MS
Masses of main fragments	ESI-MS [M-H]- m/z : 169.0137 ms/ms (iontrap)@35 CE m/z product 125(100), 81(<1)

== See also ==
- Benzoic acid
- Catechol
- Hydrolyzable tannin
- Pyrogallol
- Syringol
- Syringaldehyde
- Syringic acid
- Shikimic acid
