= Antaeotricha lindseyi =

Scientific classification
- Domain: Eukaryota
- Kingdom: Animalia
- Phylum: Arthropoda
- Class: Insecta
- Order: Lepidoptera
- Family: Depressariidae
- Genus: Antaeotricha
- Species: A. lindseyi

Binomial name
- Antaeotricha lindseyi (Barnes & Busck, 1920)

Synonyms
- Stenoma lindseyi Barnes & Busck, 1920

Species of moth

Antaeotricha lindseyi is a moth in the family Depressariidae. It was described by William Barnes and August Busck in 1920. It is found in North America, where it has been recorded from California, Arizona and New Mexico.

The wingspan is 25–28 mm. Adults are similar to Antaeotricha schlaegeri, but the forewings are somewhat longer, narrower and more pointed and the dark dorsal area, which in schlaegeri is interrupted by white shortly beyond the middle of the wing, is continued to the tornus. The hindwings of the males are dark brownish or blackish fuscous, very considerably darker than those of schlaegeri.
