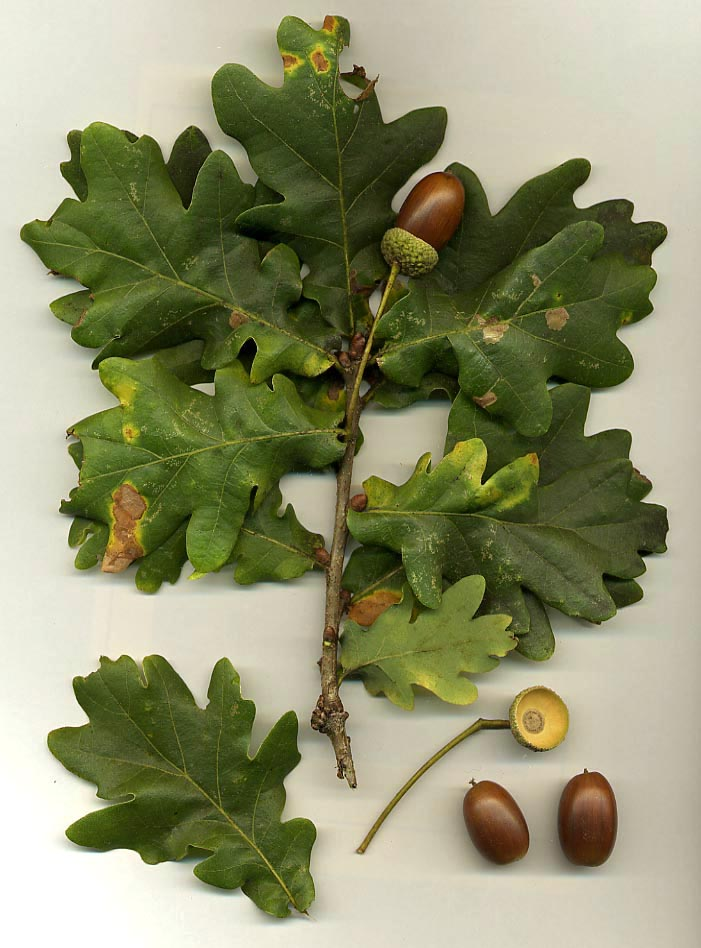
- Leaves and acorns

Conservation status
- Least Concern (IUCN 3.1)

Scientific classification
- Kingdom: Plantae
- Clade: Tracheophytes
- Clade: Angiosperms
- Clade: Eudicots
- Clade: Rosids
- Order: Fagales
- Family: Fagaceae
- Genus: Quercus
- Subgenus: Quercus subg. Quercus
- Section: Quercus sect. Quercus
- Species: Q. robur

Binomial name
- Quercus robur L.

Subspecies
- Quercus robur subsp. brutia (Ten.) O.Schwarz; Quercus robur subsp. imeretina (Steven ex Woronow) Menitsky; Quercus robur subsp. pedunculiflora (K.Koch) Menitsky; Quercus robur subsp. robur
- Native distribution of pedunculate oak

Synonyms
- List: Quercus abbreviata Vuk.; Quercus accessiva Gand. not validly published; Quercus accomodata Gand. not validly published; Quercus acutiloba Borbás; Quercus aesculus Boiss.; Quercus aestivalis Steven; Quercus afghanistanensis K.Koch; Quercus alligata Gand. not validly published; Quercus altissima Petz. & G.Kirchn.; Quercus amoenifolia Gand. not validly published; Quercus appenina var. cylindracea (Guss. ex Parl.) Nyman; Quercus appenina var. rumelica (Griseb. & Schenk) Nyman; Quercus apula Gand. not validly published; Quercus arenaria Borbás; Quercus argentea Morogues; Quercus assimilis Gand. not validly published; Quercus asterotricha Borbás & Csató; Quercus asturica Gand. not validly published; Quercus atropurpurea K.Koch; Quercus atrosanguinea K.Koch; Quercus atrovirens Sm.; Quercus aurea K.Koch; Quercus australis A.Kern.; Quercus auzin Secondat ex Bosc.; Quercus avellanoides Vuk.; Quercus axillaris Schur; Quercus banatica Gand. not validly published; Quercus batavica Gand. not validly published; Quercus bavarica Gand. not validly published; Quercus bedoi Borbás; Quercus belgica Gand. not validly published; Quercus bellogradensis Borbás; Quercus borealis var. pilosa (Schur) Simonk.; Quercus brachycarpa Guss. ex Parl.; Quercus brevipes A.Kern.; Quercus brevipes Borbás; Quercus brutia Ten.; Quercus bruttia Borbás; Quercus castanoides Vuk.; Quercus commiserata Gand. not validly published; Quercus comptoniifolia K.Koch; Quercus concordia K.Koch; Quercus condensata Schur; Quercus coriifolia Vuk.; Quercus crispa Vuk.; Quercus croatica Gand. not validly published; Quercus cunisecta Borbás; Quercus cuprea K.Koch; Quercus cupressoides K.Koch; Quercus cupulatus Gilib. not validly published; Quercus cylindracea Guss. ex Parl.; Quercus dacica Gand. not validly published; Quercus danubialis Gand. not validly published; Quercus dilatata A.Kern.; Quercus discredens Gand. not validly published; Quercus dissecta K.Koch; Quercus emarginulata Gand. not validly published; Quercus erucifolia Steven; Quercus esthonica Gand. not validly published; Quercus estremadurensis O.Schwarz; Quercus ettingeri Vuk.; Quercus extensa (Schur) Schur; Quercus falkenbergensis Booth ex Loudon; Quercus farinosa Vuk.; Quercus fastigiata Lam.; Quercus femina Mill.; Quercus fennessii A.DC.; Quercus filicifolia A.DC.; Quercus filipendula Schloss. & Vuk.; Quercus foemida Mill.; Quercus fructipendula Schrank; Quercus frutetorum Gand. not validly published; Quercus geltowiensis K.Koch; Quercus germanica Lasch; Quercus grecescui Gand. not validly published; Quercus haas Kotschy; Quercus haerens Gand. not validly published; Quercus hentzei Petz. & G.Kirchn.; Quercus hispanica Willk.; Quercus hodginsii Lodd. ex Steud. not validly published; Quercus hohenackeri Gand. not validly published; Quercus horizontalis Dippel; Quercus hyemalis Steven; Quercus imeretina Steven ex Woronow; Quercus immodica Gand. not validly published; Quercus implicata Gand. not validly published; Quercus kunzei Gand. not validly published; Quercus kurdica Wenz.; Quercus laciniata Lodd.; Quercus lanuginosa Beck; Quercus lasistan Kotschy ex A.DC.; Quercus lentula Gand. not validly published; Quercus longaeva Salisb. not validly published; Quercus longiglans Debeaux; Quercus longipedunculata Cariot & St.-Lag.; Quercus longipes Steven; Quercus louettii Dippel; Quercus lucorum Vuk.; Quercus ludens Gand. not validly published; Quercus lugdunensis Gand. not validly published; Quercus macroloba Gand. not validly published; Quercus madritensis Gand. not validly published; Quercus malacophylla (Schur) Schur; Quercus mestensis Bondev & Gancev; Quercus microcarpa Lapeyr.; Quercus microcarpa Morogues; Quercus monorensis Simonk.; Quercus montivaga Gand. not validly published; Quercus natalis Gand. not validly published; Quercus nescensis Gand. not validly published; Quercus nigricans K.Koch; Quercus ochracea Morogues; Quercus oelandica Gand. not validly published; Quercus paleacea Desf.; Quercus palmata Vuk.; Quercus parmenteria Mutel; Quercus pectinata K.Koch; Quercus pedemontana Colla; Quercus pedunculata Ehrh.; Quercus pedunculata Hoffm.; Quercus pedunculiflora K.Koch; Quercus pendula (Neill) Lodd.; Quercus pendulina Kit.; Quercus petropolitana Gand. not validly published; Quercus pilosa (Schur) Simonk.; Quercus pilosula Gand. not validly published; Quercus pinnatipartita (Boiss.) O.Schwarz; Quercus plebeia Gand. not validly published; Quercus pluriceps Gand. not validly published; Quercus pseudopedunculata Vuk.; Quercus pseudoschorochensis Boiss.; Quercus pseudosessilis Schur; Quercus pseudotscharakensis Kotschy ex A.DC.; Quercus pulverulenta K.Koch; Quercus purpurea Lodd. ex Loudon; Quercus pyramidalis C.C.Gmel.; Quercus pyrenaica Steven; Quercus quaerens Gand. not validly published; Quercus racemosa Lam.; Quercus robur (Ten.) A. DC.; Quercus rossica Gand. not validly published; Quercus rostanii Gand. not validly published; Quercus rubens Petz. & G.Kirchn.; Quercus rubicunda Dippel; Quercus rumelica Griseb. & Schenk; Quercus salicifolia Steud. not validly published; Quercus scandica Gand. nom. not validly published; Quercus schlosseriana Gand. not validly published; Quercus scolopendrifolia K.Koch; Quercus scotica Gand. not validly published; Quercus scythica Gand. not validly published; Quercus semipinnata Gand. not validly published; Quercus sessiliflora var. condensata (Schur) Nyman; Quercus sessiliflora var. microcarpa (Lapeyr.) Nyman; Quercus sessiliflora var. pedemontana (Colla) Nyman; Quercus sessiliflora var. tcharachensis Albov; Quercus sieboldii Dippel; Quercus similata Gand. not validly published; Quercus speciensis Dippel; Quercus stilbophylla Gand. not validly published; Quercus subvelutina Schur; Quercus svecica Borbás; Quercus tanaicensis Gand. not validly published; Quercus tardiflora Czern. ex Stev.; Quercus tennesi Wesm.; Quercus tephrochlamys Gand. not validly published; Quercus tetracarpa Vuk.; Quercus tholeyroniana Gand. not validly published; Quercus thomasii Ten.; Quercus tomentosa Ehrh. ex A.DC. not validly published; Quercus tozzae Dippel; Quercus transiens Gand. not validly published; Quercus tricolor Petz. & G.Kirchn.; Quercus tristis Gand. not validly published; Quercus turbinata Kit.; Quercus urbica Gand. not validly published; Quercus vallicola Gand. not validly published; Quercus verecunda Gand. not validly published; Quercus versatilis Gand. not validly published; Quercus vialis Gand. not validly published; Quercus viminalis Bosc; Quercus virgata Martrin-Donos; Quercus volhynica Gand. not validly published; Quercus vulgaris Bubani; Quercus welandii Simonk.; Quercus wolgensis Gand. not validly published

= Quercus robur =

Species of flowering plant

Quercus robur, pedunculate oak, European oak, or English oak, is a species of flowering plant in the beech and oak family, Fagaceae. It is a large tree, native to Europe and western Asia, and is widely cultivated in other temperate regions. It grows on soils of near neutral acidity in the lowlands and is notable for its value to natural ecosystems, supporting a diversity of herbivorous insects, acorn eating mammals and birds, and fungi.

The common name pedunculate oak refers to the acorns being borne on a peduncule, or stalk.

English oaks can live to very old ages, often growing for over 500 years, with some specimens believed to be over 1,000 years old. They are characterised by thick and heavily fissured bark.

== Description ==
Pedunculate oak is a deciduous tree, typically maturing at up to 20 m in height, and sometimes up to 40 metres (130 ft), with a single stout trunk typically reaching up to 4 m, sometimes exceeding 10 m (33 ft) in girth (circumference at breast height), or even reportedly 14 m in pollarded specimens. Older trees tend to be pollarded, with boles (the main trunk) about 3 m long. They often live longer and become more stout than unpollarded trees.

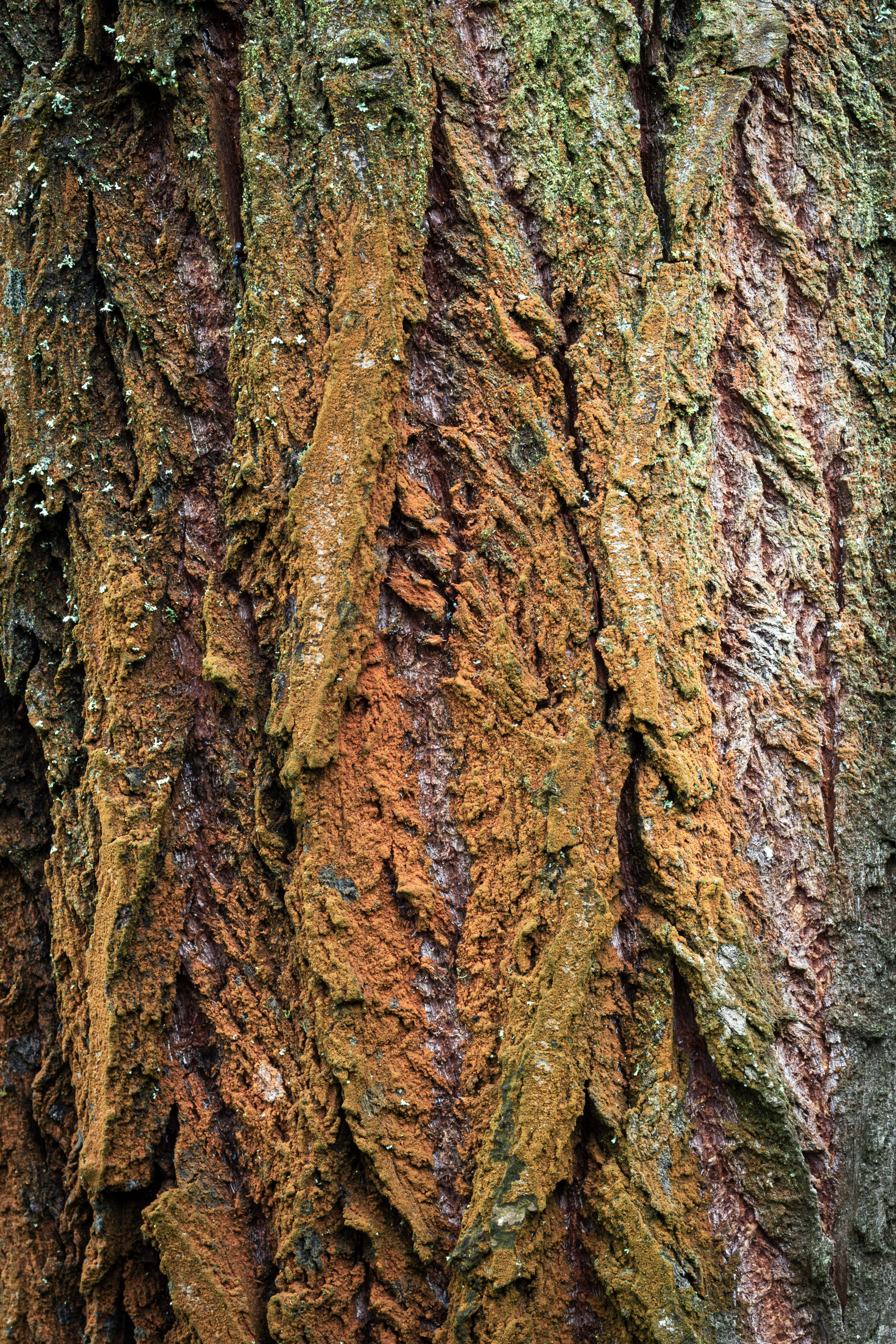
Oak bark.

The crown is spreading and unevenly domed, and trees often have massive lower branches. The bark is greyish-brown and closely grooved, with vertical plates. There are often large burrs on the trunk, which typically produce many small shoots. Oaks do not produce suckers but do recover well from pruning or lightning damage. The twigs are hairless and the buds are rounded (ovoid), brownish and pointed.

The leaves are arranged alternately along the twigs and are broadly oblong or ovate, 10–12 cm long by 7–8 cm wide, with a short (typically 2–3 mm) petiole. They have a cordate (auricled) base and 3–6 rounded lobes, divided no further than halfway to the midrib. The leaves are usually glabrous or have just a few simple hairs on the lower surface. They are dark green above, paler below, and are often covered in small disks of spangle gall by autumn.

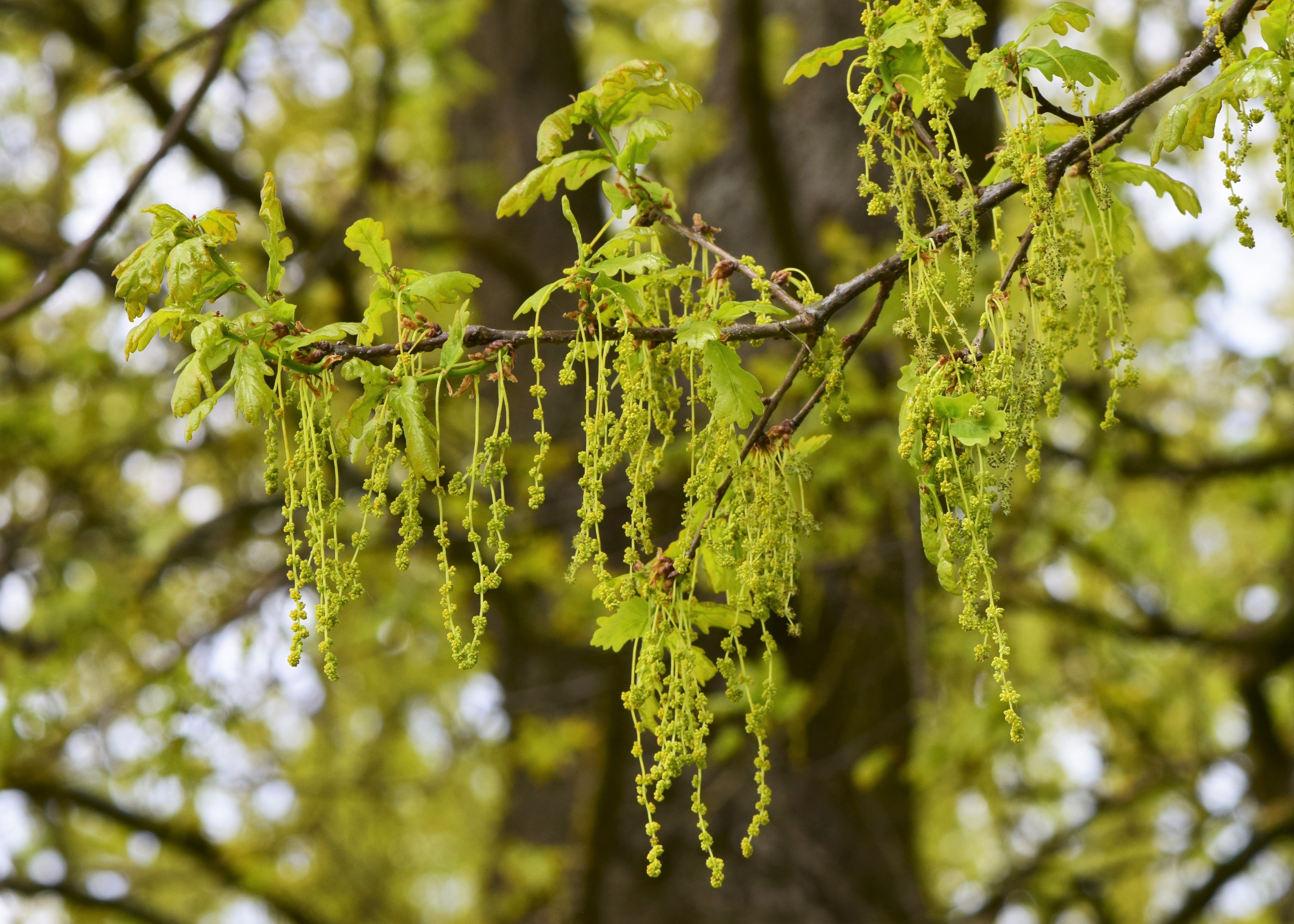
Male flowers

Flowering takes place in spring (early May in Northern Europe) and the flowers are wind-pollinated. The male flowers occur in narrow catkins some 2–4 cm long and arranged in small bunches. The female flowers are small, brown with dark red stigmas, about 2 mm in diameter and are found at the tips of new shoots on peduncles 2–5 cm long.

The fruits (acorns) are borne in clusters of 2–3 on a long peduncle (stalk) 4–8 cm long. Each acorn is 1.5–4 cm long, ovoid with a pointed tip, starting whitish-green and becoming brown, then black. The acorns are carried in a distinctive shallow cup which can be useful in identifying the species. It is an "alternate bearing" species, with large crops produced every other year.

=== Chemistry ===
Grandinin/roburin E, castalagin/vescalagin, gallic acid, monogalloyl glucose (glucogallin) and valoneic acid dilactone, monogalloyl glucose, digalloyl glucose, trigalloyl glucose, rhamnose, quercitrin and ellagic acid are phenolic compounds found in Q. robur. The heartwood contains triterpene saponins.

=== Similar species ===
Q. robur is most likely to be confused with sessile oak, which shares much of its range. Distinguishing features of Q. robur include the auricles at the leaf base, the very short petiole, its clusters of acorns being borne on a long peduncle, and the lack of stellate hairs on the underside of the leaf. The two often hybridise in the wild, forming Quercus × rosacea.

Turkey oak is also sometimes confused with it, but that species has "whiskers" on the winter buds and deeper lobes on the leaves (often more than halfway to the midrib). The acorn cups are also very different.

== Taxonomy ==
Quercus robur (from the Latin quercus, "oak" + robur derived from a word meaning robust, strong) was named by Carl Linnaeus in Species Plantarum (1753). It is the type species of the genus and classified in the white oak section (Quercus section Quercus).

The genome of Q. robur has been completely sequenced (GenOak project); the first version was published in 2016. It comprises 12 chromosome pairs (2n = 24), about 26,000 genes and 750 million bp.

There are many synonyms, and numerous varieties and subspecies have been named. The populations in Iberia, Italy, southeast Europe, and Asia Minor and the Caucasus are sometimes treated as separate species, Q. orocantabrica, Q. brutia Tenore, Q. pedunculiflora K. Koch and Q. haas Kotschy respectively.

Quercus × rosacea (Q. petraea x Q. robur) is the only naturally occurring hybrid, but the following crosses with other white oak species have been produced in cultivation:

- Q. × bimundorum (Q. alba × Q. robur) (two worlds oak)
- Q. × macdanielli (Q. macrocarpa × Q. robur) (heritage oak)
- Q. × turneri Willd. (Q. ilex × Q. robur) (Turner's oak)
- Q. × warei (Q. robur 'Fastigiata' x Q. bicolor).

There are numerous cultivars available, among which the following are commonly grown:

- 'Fastigiata', cypress oak, is a large imposing tree with a narrow columnar habit.
- 'Concordia', golden oak, is a small, very slow-growing tree, eventually reaching 10 m (33 ft), with bright golden-yellow leaves throughout spring and summer. It was originally raised in Van Geert's nursery at Ghent in 1843.
- 'Pendula', weeping oak, is a small to medium-sized tree with pendulous branches, reaching up to 15 m (49 ft).
- 'Purpurea' is another small form, growing to 10 m (33 ft), with purple leaves.
- 'Pectinata' (syn. 'Filicifolia'), cut-leaved oak, is a cultivar where the leaf is pinnately divided into fine, forward-pointing segments.

=== Names ===
Quercus robur has numerous common names including pedunculate oak, common oak, European oak, or English oak. In French it is called chêne pédonculé. As a wood product its timber will often be called French oak, Polish oak, Slavonian oak, or similar names based upon its geographic origin.

== Distribution ==
The species is native to most of Europe and western Asia, and is widely cultivated in other temperate regions.

== Habitat and ecology ==
Pedunculate oak is a long-lived tree of high-canopy woodland, coppice and wood pasture, and it is commonly planted in hedges. It is rare on thin, well-drained calcareous (chalk and limestone) soil. Sometimes it is found on the margins of swamps, rivers and ponds, showing that it is fairly tolerant of intermittent flooding.

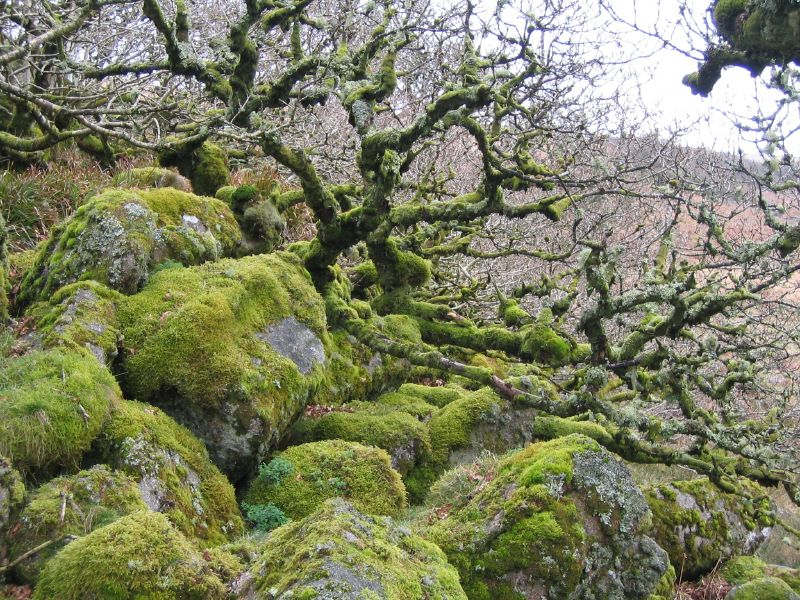
Ancient pedunculate oaks at Wistman's Wood in Devon, England

Its Ellenberg values (as revised in 2022) in Europe are L = 7, T = 6, F = 6, R = 5, N = 2-6 and S = 0, which describe how it favours conditions of bright sunlight, moderate temperature, moisture and pH, a wide range of nutrient levels, and low salinity.

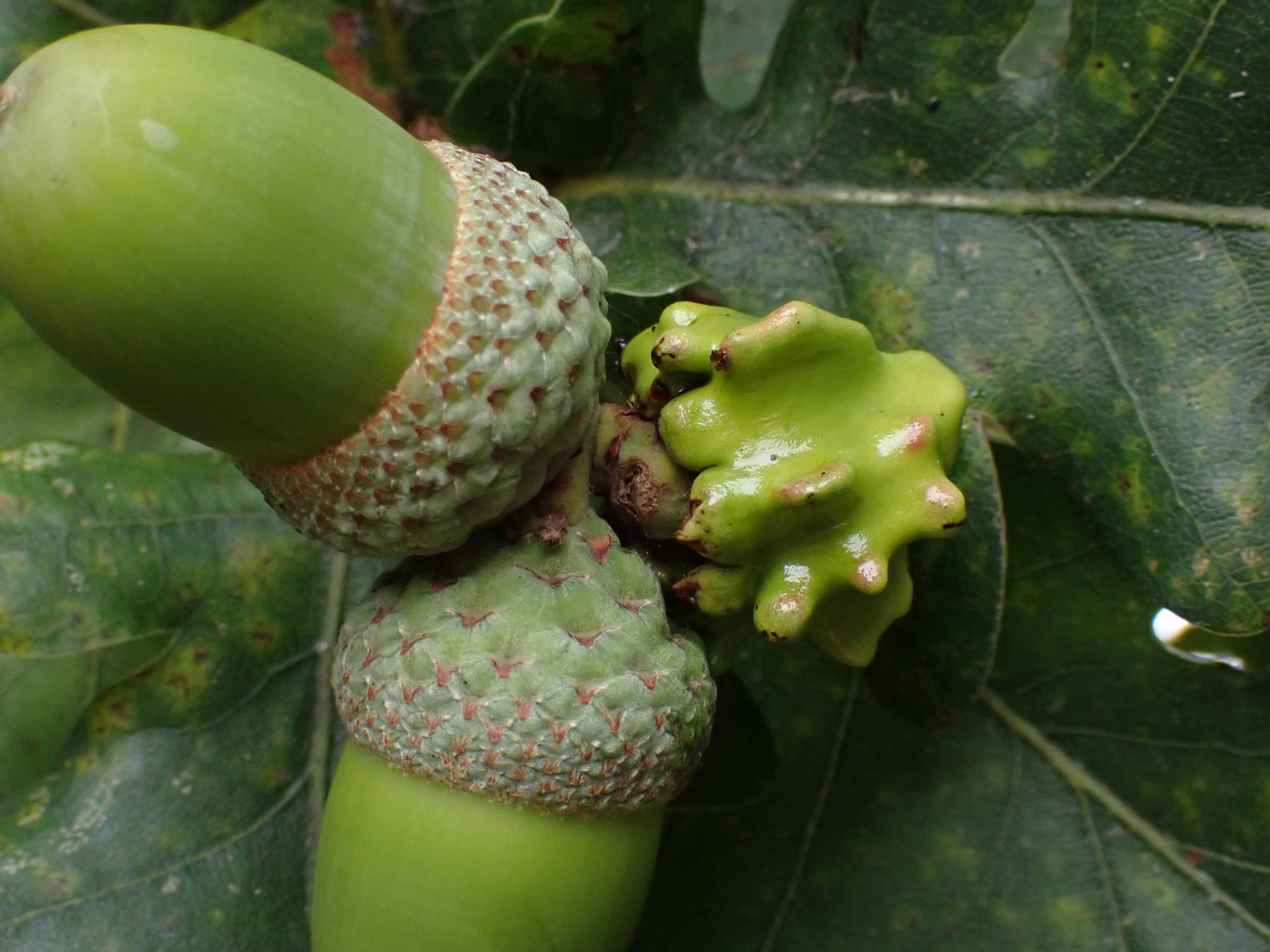
An oak knopper gall

In 2019 it was estimated that 2,300 species of insect, bryophyte, lichen, bird, mammal or other species are associated with Q. robur in the UK. Some entirely rely on it while others can make use of different tree species. Within its native range, Q. robur is valued for its importance to insects and other wildlife, famously supporting the highest biodiversity of insect herbivores of any British plant (at least 400 species). The most well-known of these are the ones that form galls, which number about 35. The knopper gall is very common, and Andricus grossulariae produces somewhat similar spiky galls on the acorn cups. Also common are two types of spherical galls on the twigs: the oak marble gall and the cola nut gall. The latter are smaller and rougher than the former. A single, large exit hole indicates that the wasp inside has escaped, whereas several smaller holes show that it was parasitised by another insect, and these emerged instead. The undersides of oak leaves are often covered in spangle galls, which persist after the leaves fall.

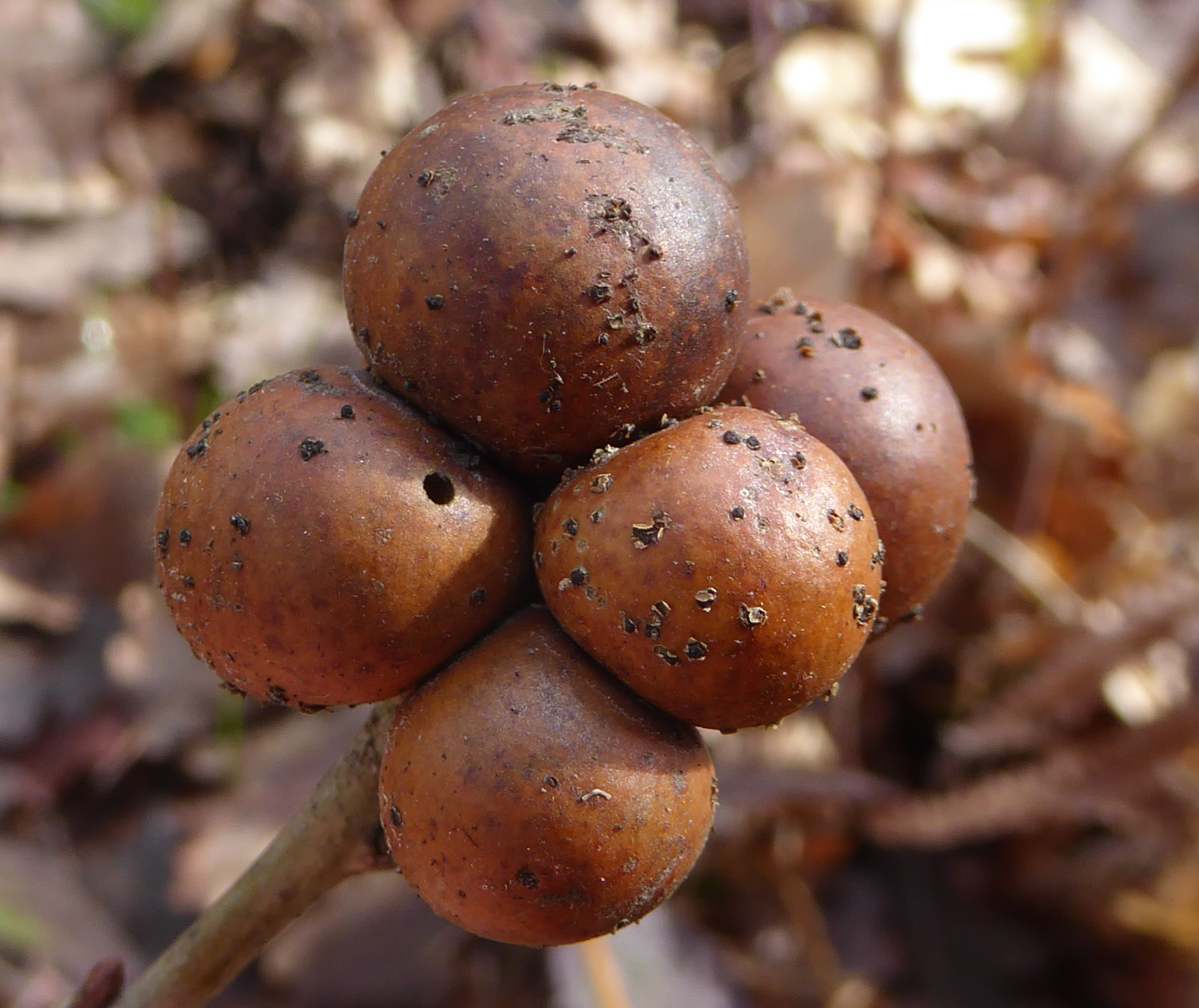
Marble galls on oak twig

One of the most distinctive galls is the oak apple, a 4.5 cm diameter spongy ball created from the buds by the wasp Biorhiza pallida. The pineapple gall, while less common, is also easily recognised.

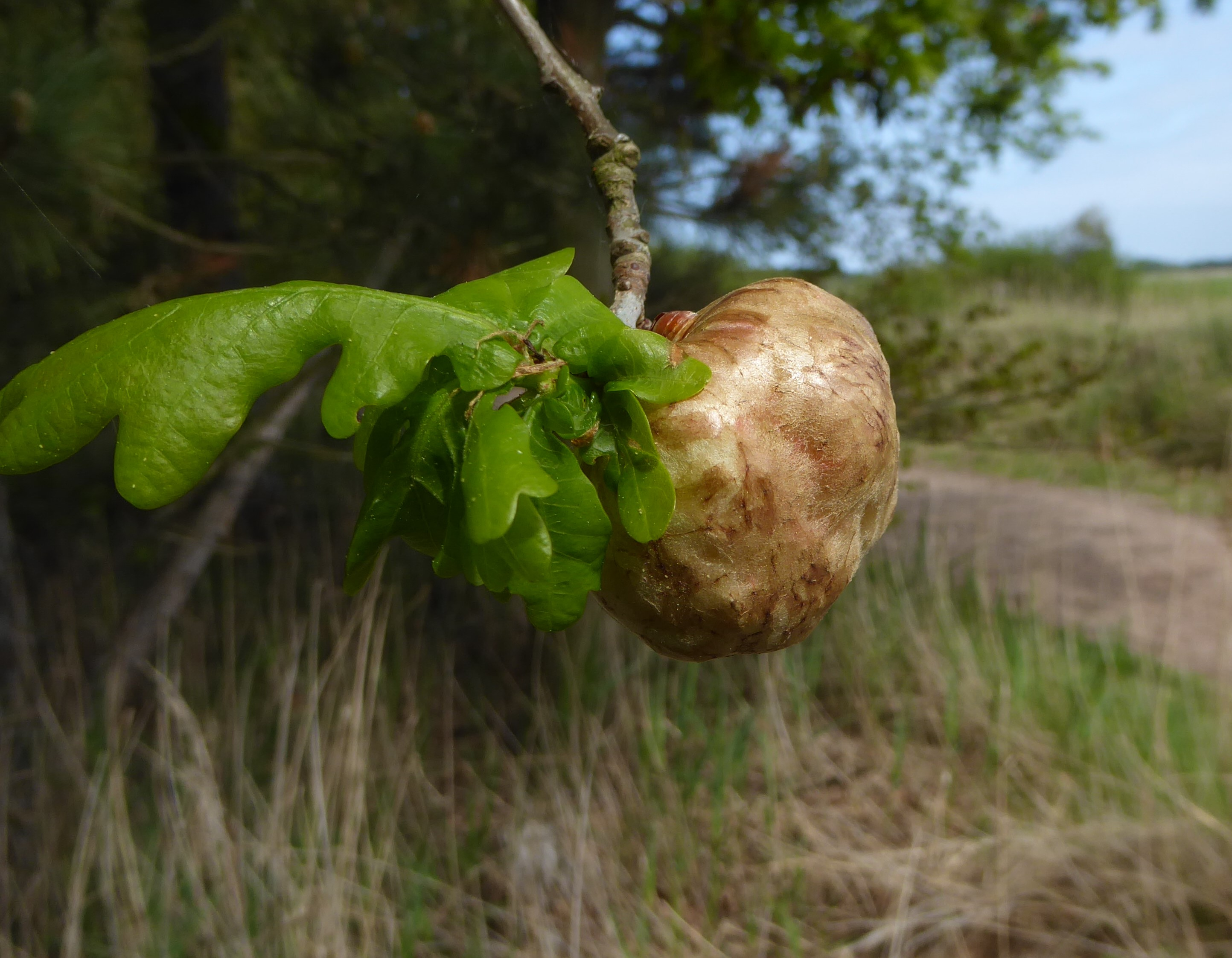
Oak apple

The quantity of caterpillar species on an oak tree increases with the age of the tree, with blue tits and great tits timing their egg hatching to the leaves opening. The most common caterpillar species include the winter moth, the green tortrix and the mottled umber, all of which can become extremely abundant on the first flush of leaves in May, but the oak trees do recover their foliage later in the year.

The acorns are typically produced in large quantities every other year (unlike Q. petraea, which produces large crops only every 4–10 years) and form a valuable food resource for several small mammals and some birds, notably Eurasian jays Garrulus glandarius. Jays were overwhelmingly the primary propagators of oaks before humans began planting them commercially (and remain the principal propagators for wild oaks), because of their habit of taking acorns from the umbra of its parent tree and burying them undamaged elsewhere.

=== Diseases ===
- Acute oak decline
- Powdery mildew caused by Erysiphe alphitoides
- Sudden oak death

== Uses ==
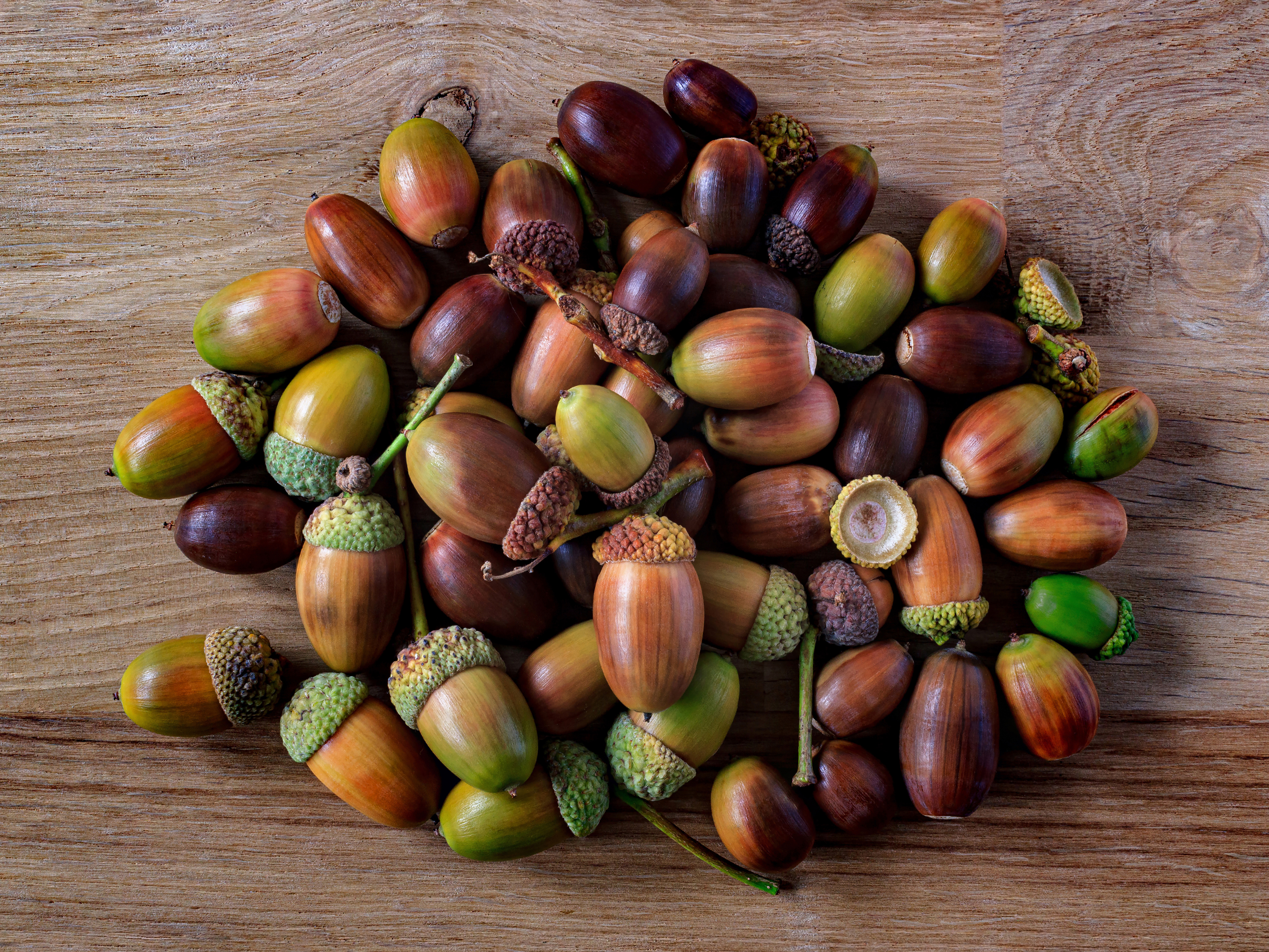
Quercus robur acorns in various stages of ripening, on an oak plank, Sweden

Quercus robur is planted for forestry, and produces a long-lasting and durable heartwood, much in demand for interior and furniture work. The wood is identified by a close examination of a cross-section perpendicular to fibres. The wood is characterised by its distinct (often wide) dark and light brown growth rings. The earlywood displays a vast number of large vessels (around 0.5 mm in diameter). There are rays of thin (about 0.1 mm) yellow or light-brown lines running across the growth rings. The timber is around 720 kg per cubic meter in density.

Additionally, although bitter due to their high tannin content, the acorns can be roasted and ground into a coffee substitute.

== In culture ==
In the Scandinavian countries, oaks were considered the "thunderstorm trees", representing Thor, the god of thunder. A Finnish myth is that the World tree, a great oak which grew to block the movement of the sky, sunlight and moonlight, had to be felled, releasing its magic, thus creating the Milky Way. The oak tree also had a symbolic value in France. Some oaks were considered sacred by the Gauls; druids would cut down the mistletoe growing on them. Even after Christianization, oak trees were considered to protect as lightning would strike them rather than on nearby inhabitation. Such struck trees would often be turned into places of worship, like the Chêne chapelle.

In 1746, all oak trees in Finland were legally classified as royal property, and oaks had enjoyed legal protection already from the 17th century. The oak is also the regional tree of the Southwest Finland region.

During the French Revolution, oaks were often planted as trees of freedom. One such tree, planted during the 1848 Revolution, survived the destruction of Oradour-sur-Glane by the Nazis. After the announcement of General Charles de Gaulle's death, caricaturist Jacques Faizant represented him as a fallen oak.

In Germany, the oak tree can be found in several paintings of Caspar David Friedrich and in "Of the life of a Good-For-Nothing" written by Joseph Freiherr von Eichendorff as a symbol of the state protecting every citizen.

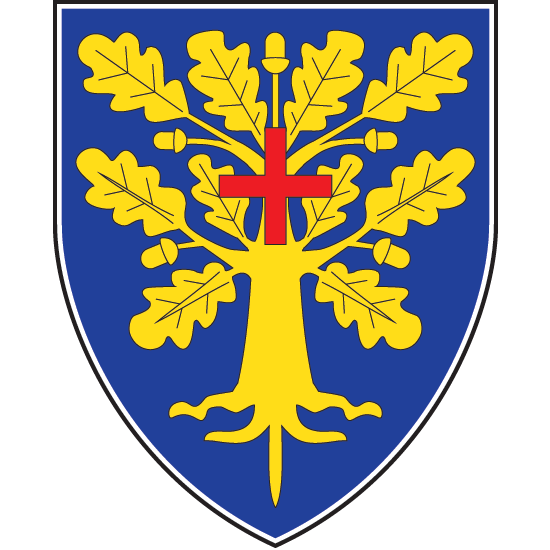
The oak in the coat of arms of Gornji Milanovac, Serbia

In Serbia the oak is a national symbol, having been part of the historical coat of arms of the Socialist Republic of Serbia, the historical coat of arms and flags of the Principality of Serbia, as well as the current traditional coat of arms and flag of Vojvodina.

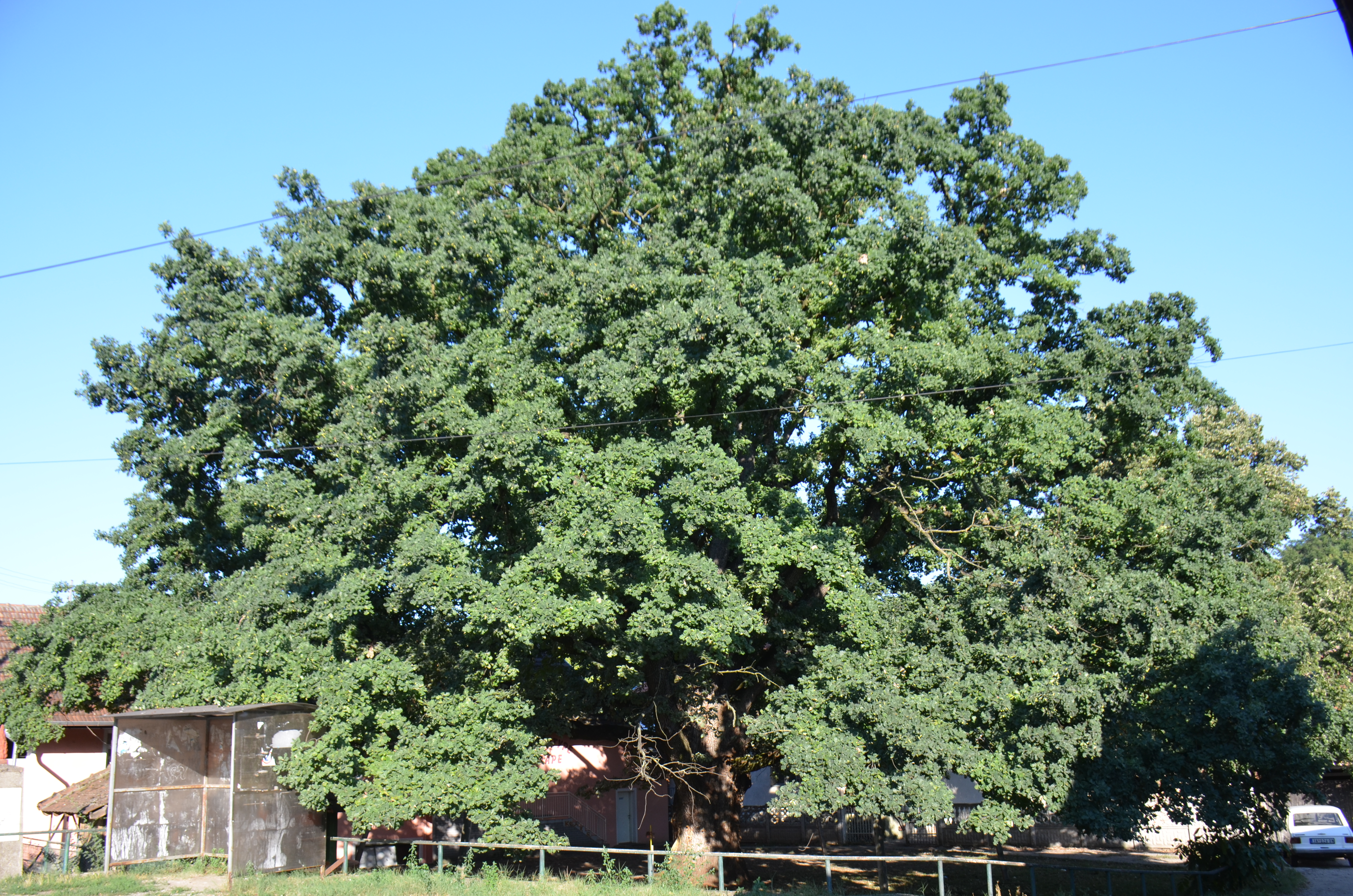
A sacred pedunculate oak tree (Zapis) in the settlement of Kolare in Jagodina, Serbia

In England, the oak has assumed the status of a national emblem. This has its origins in the oak tree at Boscobel House, where the future King Charles II hid from his Parliamentarian pursuers in 1650 during the English Civil War; the tree has since been known as the Royal Oak. This event was celebrated nationally on 29 May as Oak Apple Day, which continues to this day in some communities.

Many place names in England include a reference to this tree, including Oakley, Occold and Eyke. Copdock, in Suffolk, probably derives from a pollarded oak ("copped oak"). 'The Royal Oak' is the third most popular pub name in Britain (with 541 counted in 2007) and HMS Royal Oak has been the name of eight major Royal Navy warships. The naval associations are strengthened by the fact that oak was the main construction material for sailing warships. The Royal Navy was often described as "The Wooden Walls of Old England" (a paraphrase of the Delphic Oracle) and the Navy's official quick march is "Heart of Oak". In folklore, the Major Oak is where Robin Hood is purported to have taken shelter.

Oak leaves (not necessarily of this species) have been depicted on the Croatian 5 lipa coin; on old German Deutsche Mark currency (1 through 10 Pfennigs; the 50 Pfennigs coin showed a woman planting an oak seedling), and now on German-issued euro currency coins (1 through 5 cents); and on British pound coins (1987 and 1992 issues).

In Northern Ireland, the city of Derry, and the county of Londonderry, is an anglicisation of the Irish Daire or Doire, which translates as 'oak-grove/oak-wood'.

=== Notable trees ===
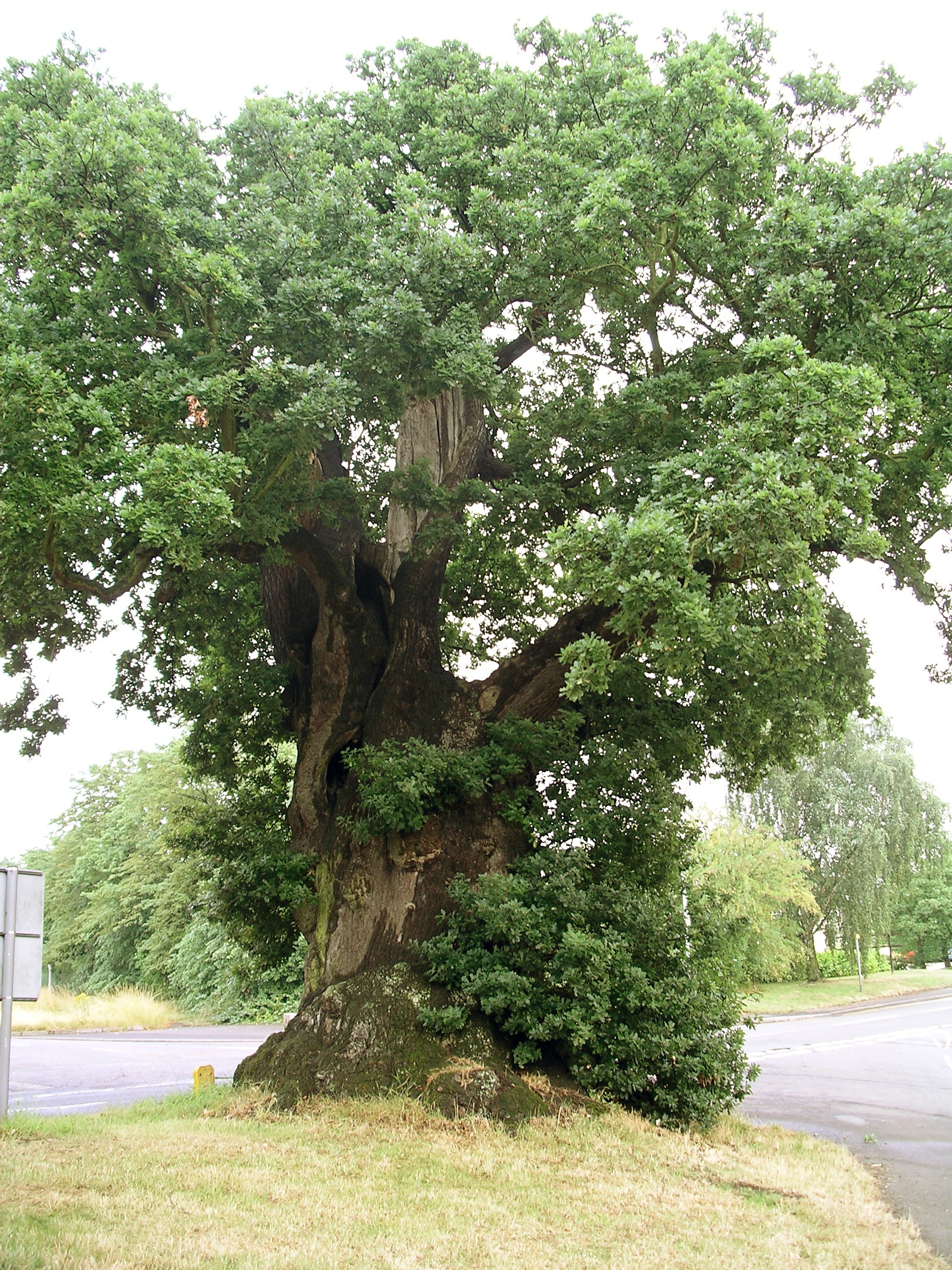
An old pedunculate oak in Baginton, England

It is often claimed that England has more ancient oaks than the rest of Europe combined. This is based on research by Aljos Farjon at the Royal Botanic Gardens, Kew, who found that there were 115 oaks (of both species) in England with a circumference of 9 m or more, compared with just 96 in the rest of Europe. This is attributed to the persistence of mediaeval deer parks in the landscape. The Majesty Oak, with a circumference of 12.2 m (40 ft), is the thickest such tree in Great Britain. The Brureika (Bridal Oak) in Norway with a circumference of 10.86 m (35.6 ft) (in 2018) and the Kaive Oak in Latvia with a circumference of 10.2 m (33 ft) are among the thickest trees in Northern Europe. The largest historical oak was known as the Imperial Oak from Bosnia and Herzegovina. This specimen was recorded at 17.5 m in circumference at breast height and estimated at over 150 m³ in total volume. It collapsed in 1998.

Two individuals of notable longevity are the Stelmužė Oak in Lithuania and the Granit Oak in Bulgaria, which are believed to be more than 1500 years old, possibly making them the oldest oaks in Europe; another specimen, called the 'Kongeegen' ('Kings Oak'), estimated to be about 1,200 years old, grows in Jægerspris, Denmark. Yet another can be found in Kvilleken, Sweden, that is over 1000 years old and 14 m (46 ft) around. Of maiden (not pollarded) specimens, one of the oldest is the great oak of Ivenack, Germany. Tree-ring research of this tree and other oaks nearby gives an estimated age of 700 to 800 years. Also the Bowthorpe Oak in Lincolnshire, England is estimated to be 1,000 years old, making it the oldest in the UK, although there is Knightwood Oak in the New Forest that is also said to be as old. The highest density of Q. robur with a circumference of 4 m (13 ft) and more is in Latvia.

In Ireland, at Birr Castle, a specimen over 400 years old has a girth of 6.5 m (21 ft), known as the Carroll Oak.

In the Basque Country (Spain and France), the 'tree of Gernika' is an ancient oak tree located in Gernika, under which the Lehendakari (Basque prime minister) swears his oath of office.

The largest example in Australia is in Donnybrook, Western Australia.

== See also ==
- Femeiche
