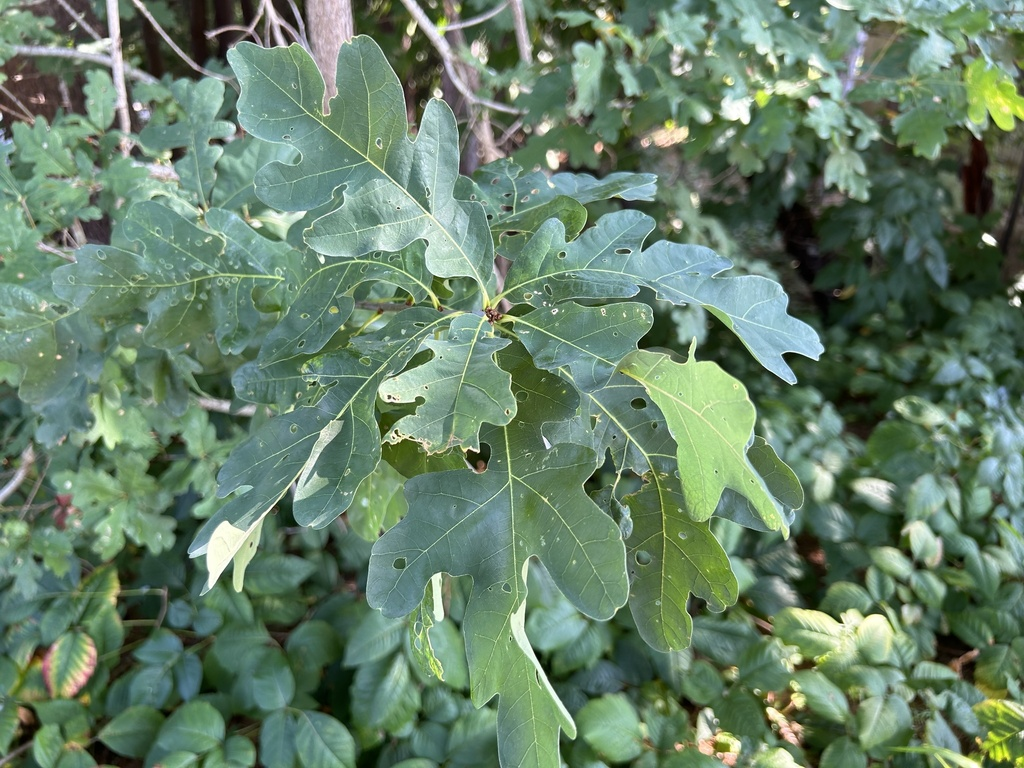

Scientific classification
- Kingdom: Plantae
- Clade: Tracheophytes
- Clade: Angiosperms
- Clade: Eudicots
- Clade: Rosids
- Order: Fagales
- Family: Fagaceae
- Genus: Quercus
- Subgenus: Quercus subg. Quercus
- Section: Quercus sect. Quercus
- Species: Q. × bimundorum

Binomial name
- Quercus × bimundorum E.J.Palmer

= Quercus × bimundorum =

Species of flowering plant

Quercus × bimundorum (or Quercus bimundorum), known as two worlds oak, is a naturally occurring hybrid of white oak, Quercus alba (from the New World), and pedunculate oak, Quercus robur (introduced from the Old World). It occurs sporadically where they come in contact in the United States. Its parents are both placed in Quercus sect. Quercus.

A tree reaching 12 m, there are commercial cultivars available, including 'Crimschmidt', trade designation Crimson Spire, with a columnar growth form, and 'Midwest', trade designation Prairie Stature, with a pyramidal growth form.

== Gallery ==
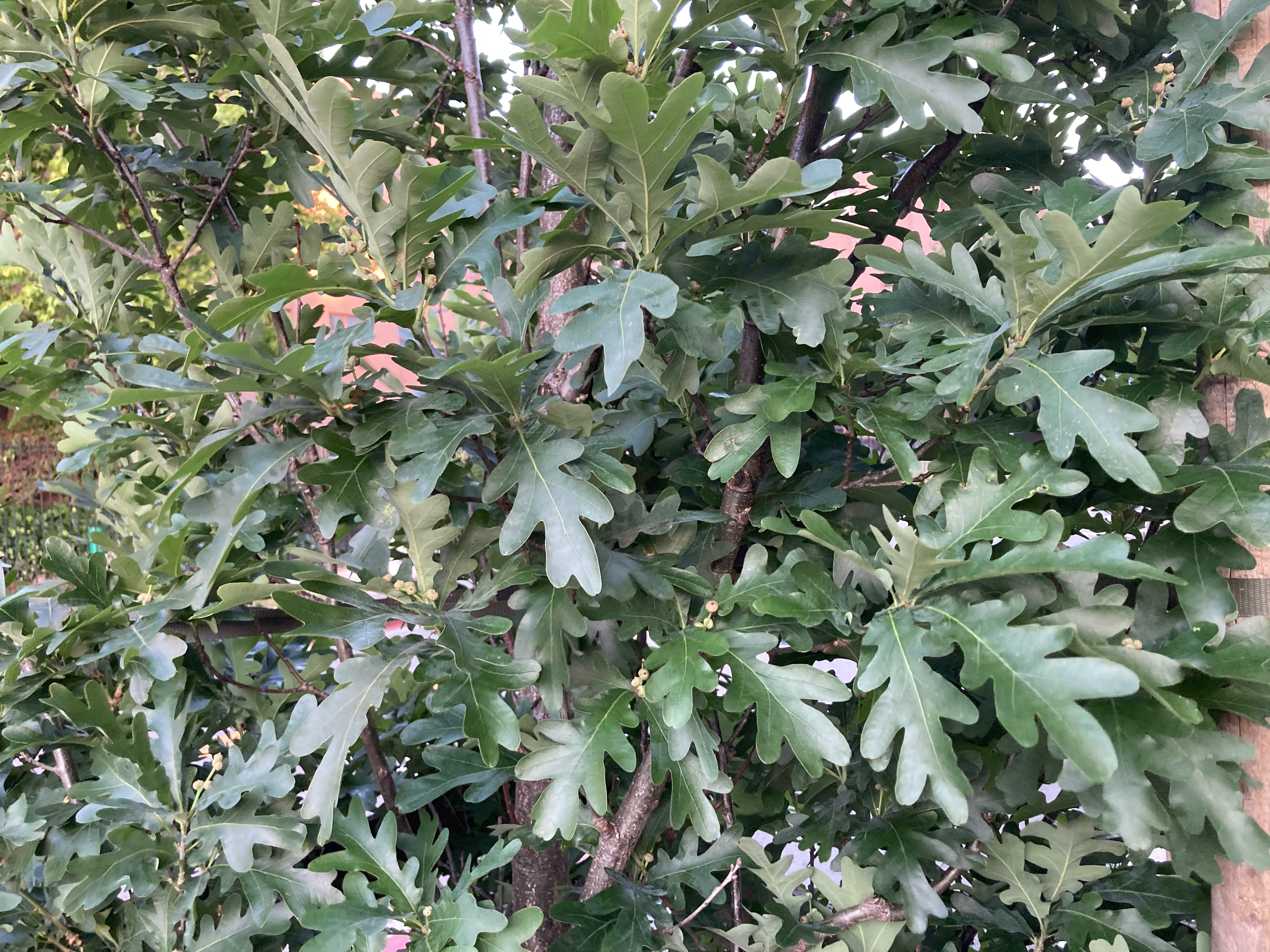
Foliage showing shape intermediate of its parents

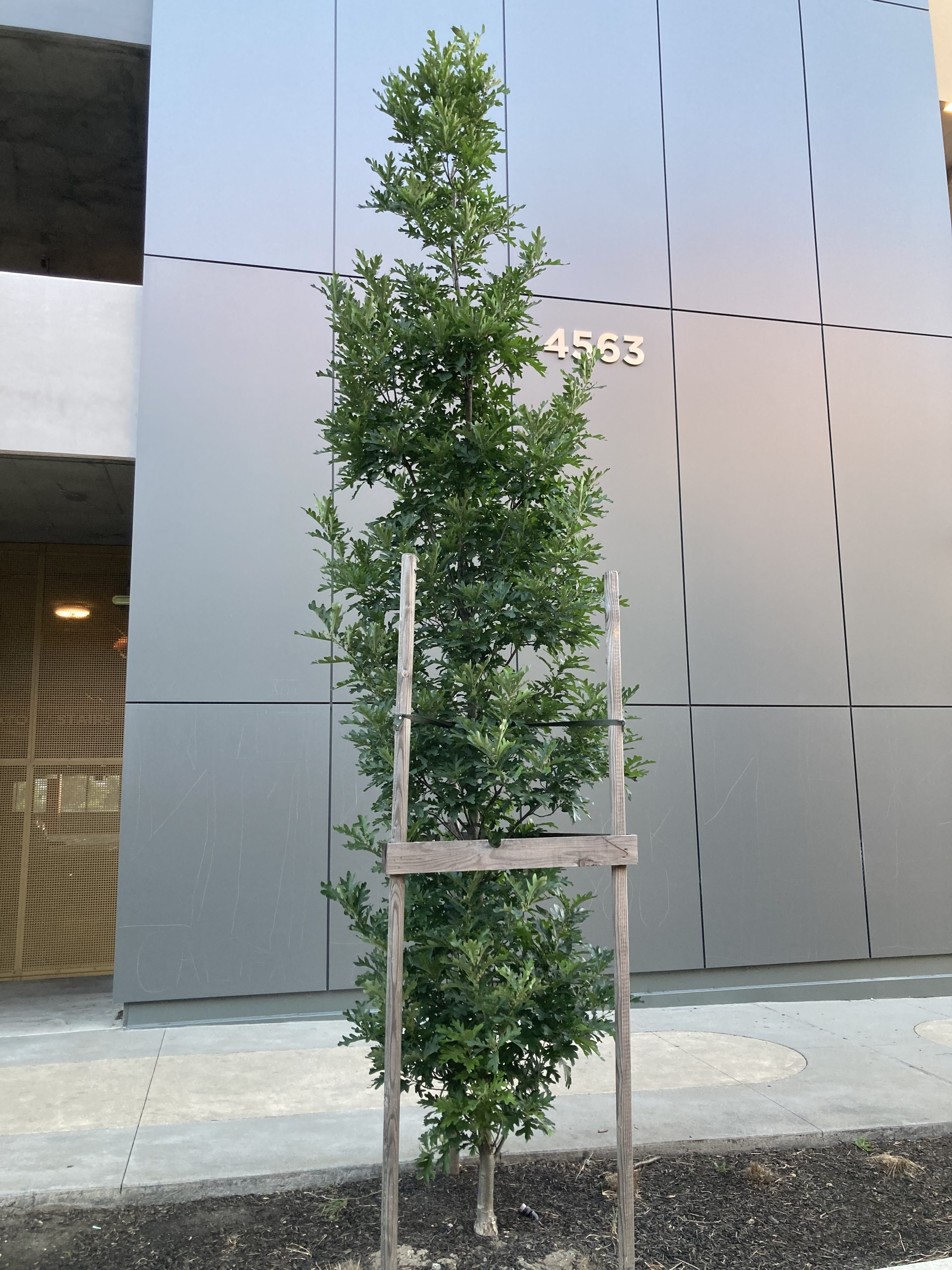
Columnar growth habit of 'Crimson Spire" in Emeryville

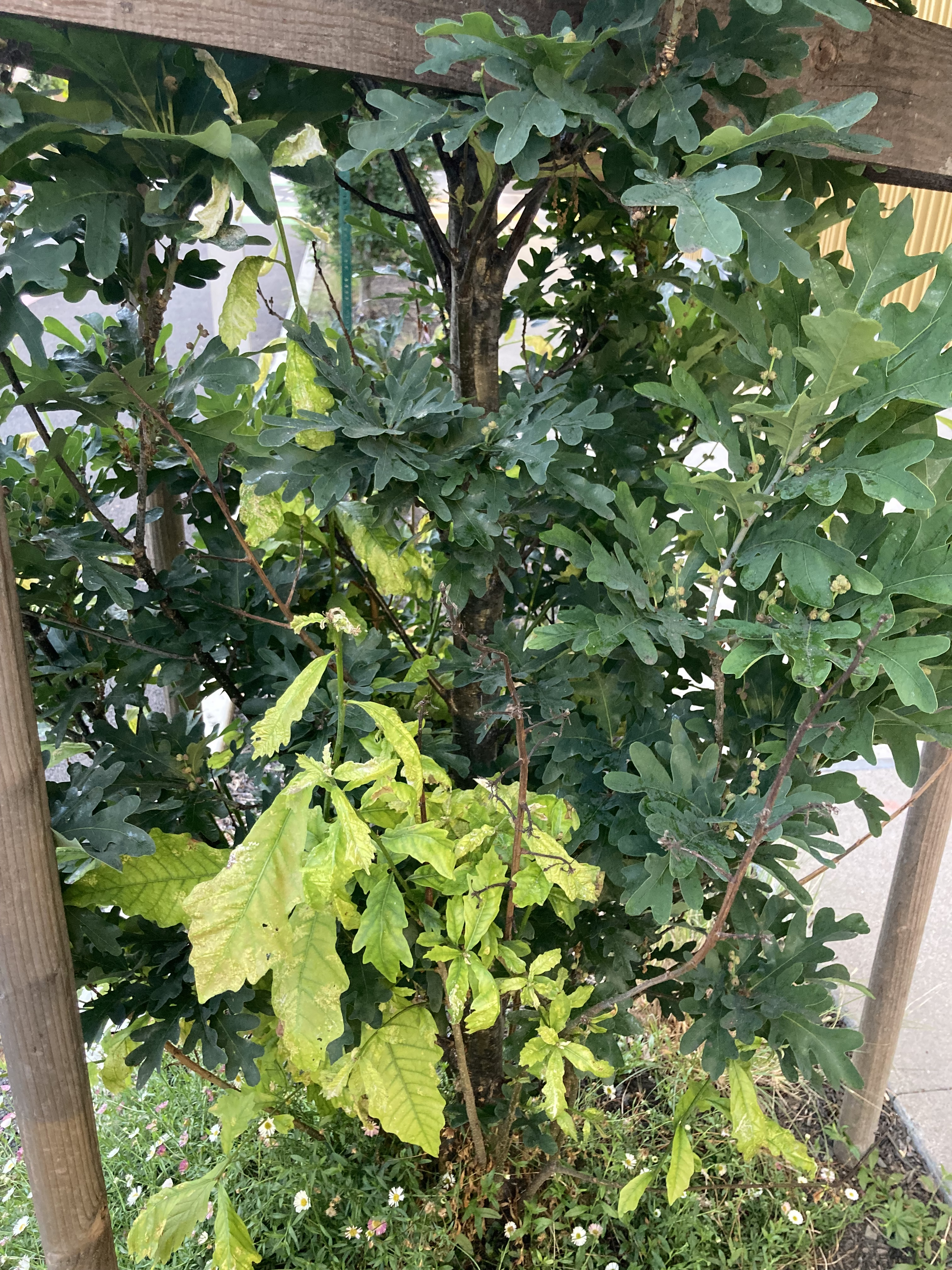
Quercus × bimundorum is sometimes grafted onto rootstocks, in this case swamp white oak, to better withstand street growing conditions.
