= Door Tree =

Tree in Hamden, Connecticut

The Door Tree
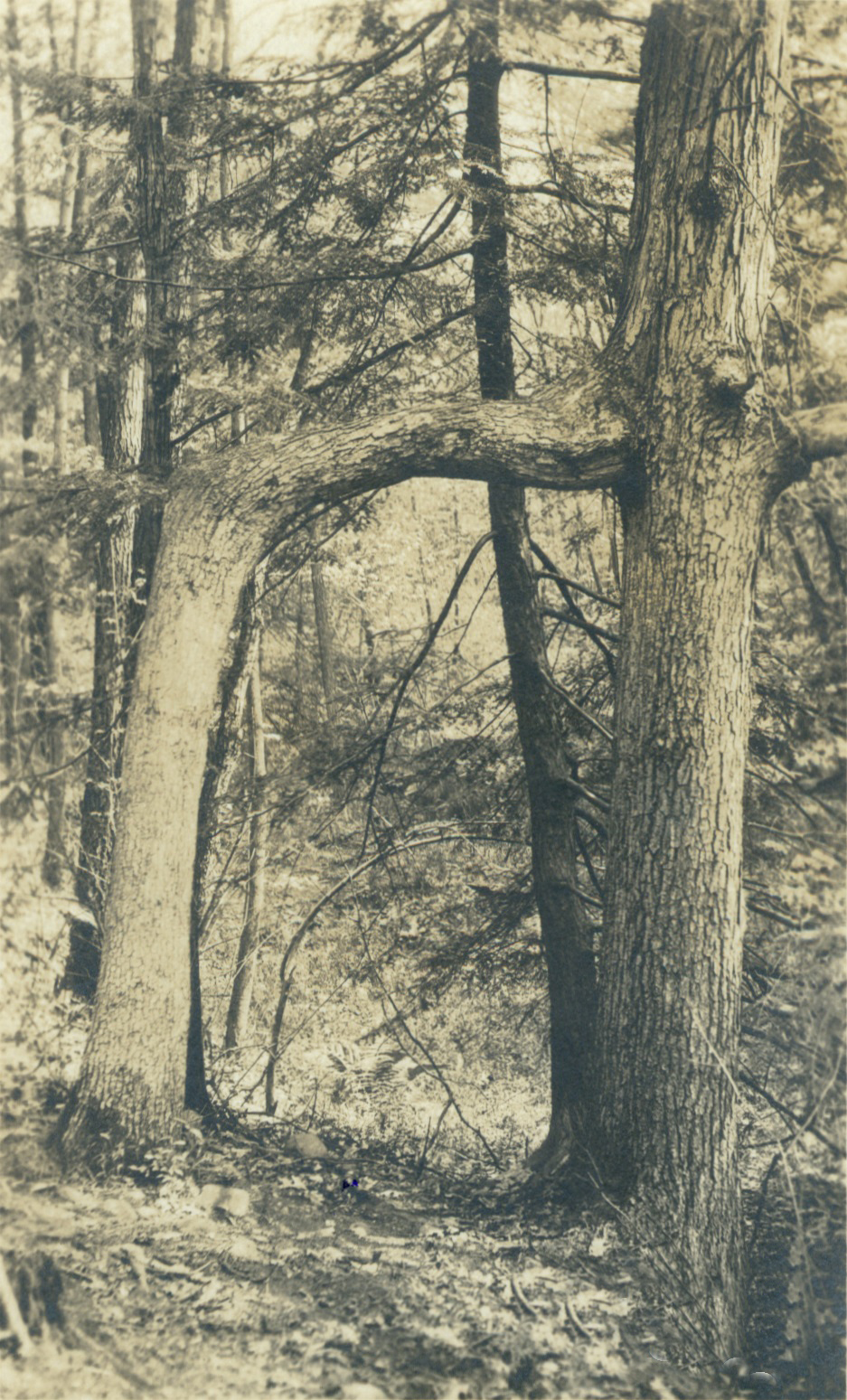
- Door Tree in 1936

- Location within Connecticut Location within the United States
- 41°24′45″N 72°53′45″W
- Type: Quercus alba (white oak)
- Location: Hamden, Connecticut, US
- Nearest city: New Haven, Connecticut

History
- Formed: c. 1819

The Door Tree was a historic and unique old white oak tree in Hamden, Connecticut, United States. The unique growth of the tree resembled a doorway opening. Door Tree was likely created when two trees grew into each other. The tree was cut down in an act of vandalism in 2019.

== History ==
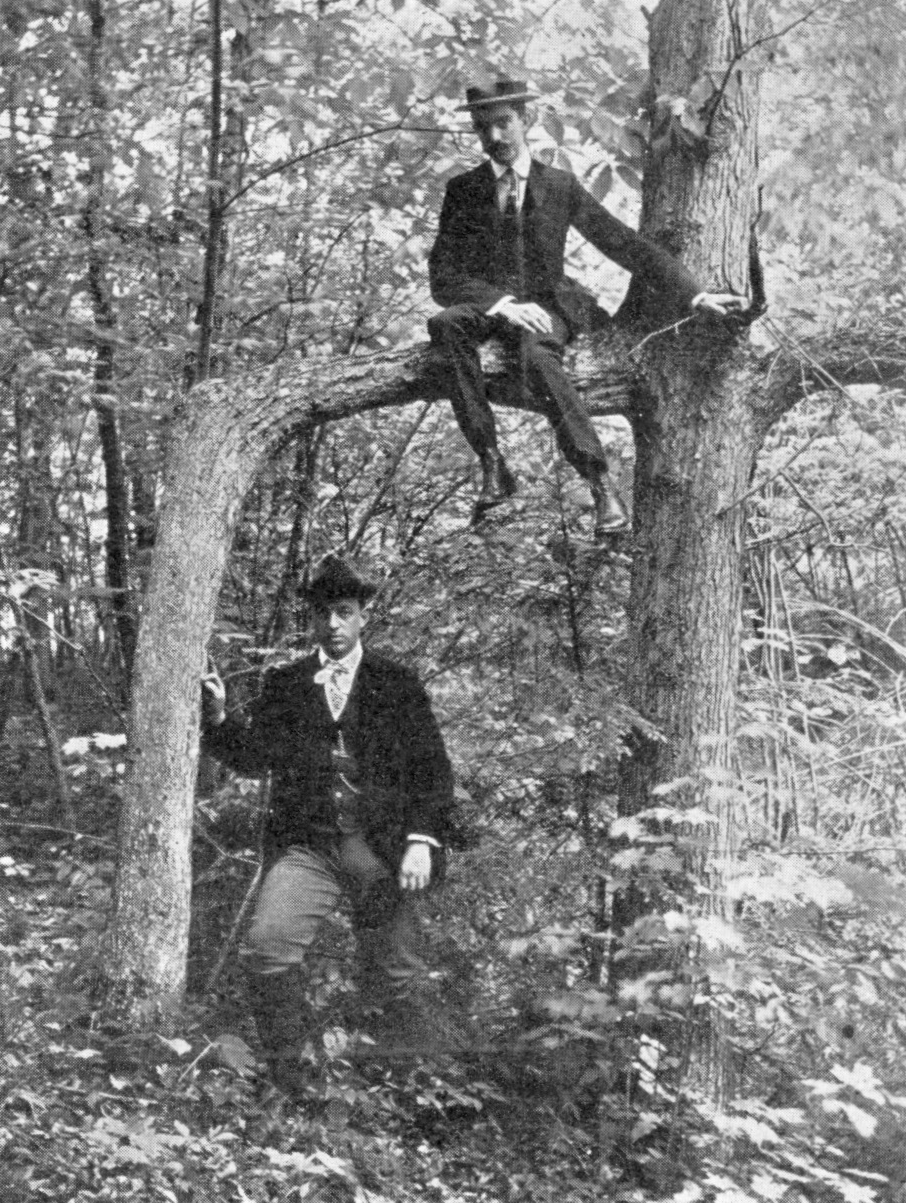
Photographer H.B. Welch (left) and J. Walter Bassett pose with Door Tree c. 1898

The tree was located on the grounds of the Regional Water Authority (RWA) and was estimated to be 175 to 200 years old when it was chainsawed down. It was not known what caused the tree to grow into the form and shape of an arch. The RWA thinks there may have been an acorn which sprouted on top of a hemlock tree or a log. The tree's unusual shape attracted interest, and it appeared on the TV show Ripley's Believe it or Not. The tree was a local landmark and it was also featured on a full page of Rachel Hartley's 1943 book The History of Hamden, Connecticut, 1786–1936.

Hamden's municipal historian, David Johnson, said the Door Tree was likely formed when two trees grew into each other.

== Destruction ==
On July 18, 2019, the tree was found sawed down and in pieces: trash was scattered near the stump. The Regional Water Authority and Hamden Historical Society each offered a $1,000 reward to find out who was responsible.

Curtis Pardee of New Haven, Connecticut, was arrested and later admitted that he felled the tree with a chainsaw. Police were able to track Pardee down from the paper garbage scattered around the sawed stump, which included envelopes addressed to him, and a small bottle of chainsaw oil which was purchased on Pardee's credit card. After being confronted with the evidence, Pardee confessed that he had cut the tree down to spite his brother. Pardee was charged with third degree criminal mischief and later claimed that he suffered from mental illness for years. Pardee also claimed that his brother loved the tree and he destroyed it because of his hatred for his brother. He claimed the destruction of the 60 to 70 foot (18 to 21 m) tall white oak tree took three days. He cut part of the tree on June 28, 2019, and then returned for the next two days to cut down the rest and he also felled a nearby tree. He claimed people were traversing the area while he was destroying the tree, but nobody questioned him.

In court he had been charged with third-degree criminal trespassing and third degree criminal mischief: as a sentence for his crime, Pardee was allowed to be a part of a supervised diversionary program. He was also ordered to donate $500 to The Nature Conservancy and pay for a plaque at the site of the felled tree if the water authority decides to commemorate the tree. He also gave an apology to the people of Hamden after the judge encouraged him to do so, but he did not apologize to his brother (known locally as Mr. Door Tree) David Pardee.

== Legacy ==
In September 2019, the town of Hamden began a project called "Project Welcome" with a plan to plant five new "door trees". The town announced that the Hamden Public Works Department would oversee the project, and the individual trees would be supervised by the Town's Tree Warden and an arborist.

Parts of the felled white oak tree were harvested and made into pens by D.L. Heritage Works of Clinton, Connecticut. The pens were given to key people from Hamden, and to the Hamden Historical Society.

A major portion of the tree was milled into slabs by furniture maker City Bench, who fabricated a bench with the archway joint. The Door-Tree Memorial Bench was dedicated by Hamden Historical Society in 2024.

== See also ==
- List of individual trees
- Lists of trees
