= Bucculatrix luteella =

Scientific classification
- Kingdom: Animalia
- Phylum: Arthropoda
- Clade: Pancrustacea
- Class: Insecta
- Order: Lepidoptera
- Family: Bucculatricidae
- Genus: Bucculatrix
- Species: B. luteella

Binomial name
- Bucculatrix luteella Chambers, 1873

Species of moth

Bucculatrix luteella is a moth in the family Bucculatricidae. It was described in 1873 by Vactor Tousey Chambers. It is found in North America, where it has been recorded from Kentucky, Ohio, Iowa, Maine, New Jersey, Pennsylvania, Washington, D.C., North Carolina and South Carolina.

The wingspan is 5–6 mm. Adults have been recorded on wing from May to September.

The larvae feed on Quercus alba and Quercus macrocarpa.
