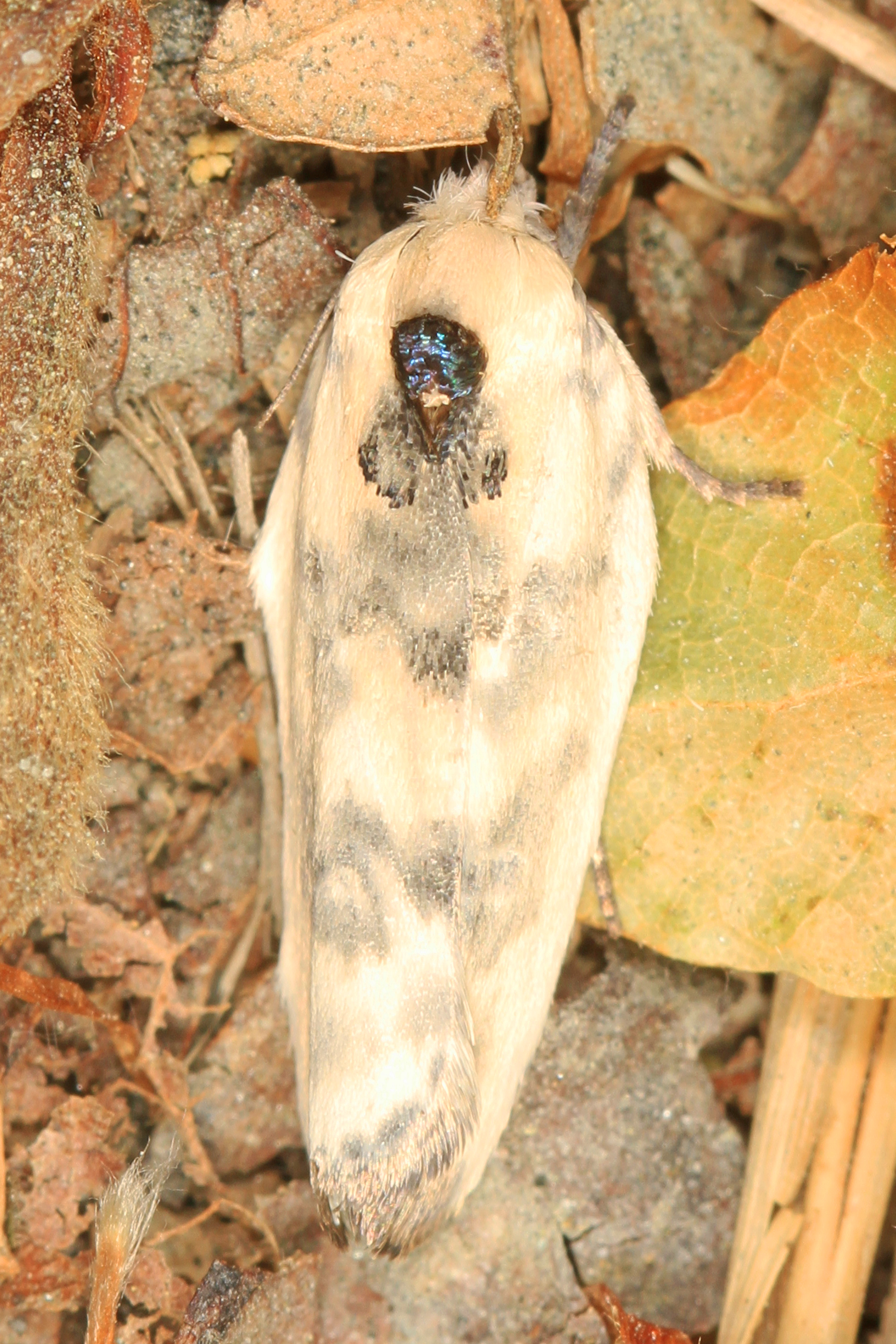
- Adult
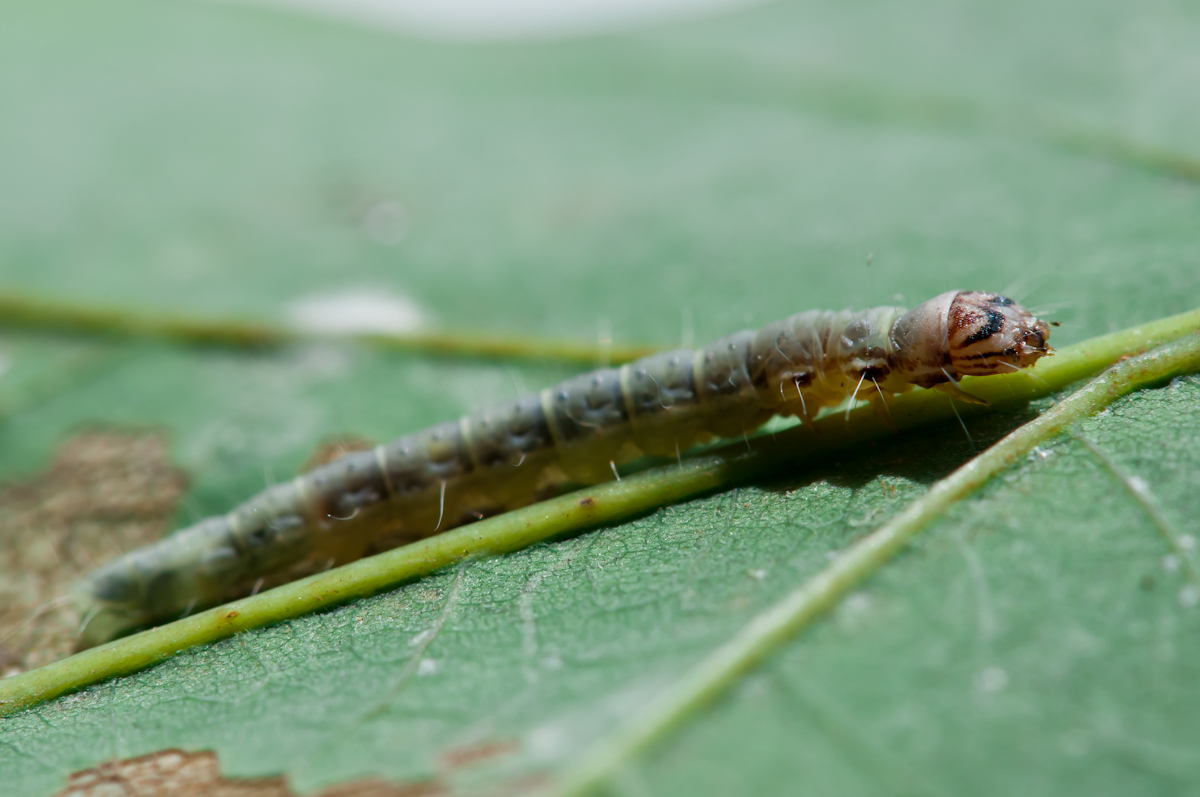
- Larva

Scientific classification
- Kingdom: Animalia
- Phylum: Arthropoda
- Clade: Pancrustacea
- Class: Insecta
- Order: Lepidoptera
- Family: Depressariidae
- Genus: Antaeotricha
- Species: A. schlaegeri

Binomial name
- Antaeotricha schlaegeri (Zeller, 1854)

Synonyms
- Antaeoricha schlaegeri

= Antaeotricha schlaegeri =

Schlaeger's fruitworm moth

Species of moth

Antaeotricha schlaegeri, the Schlaeger's fruitworm moth, is a species of moth of the family Oecophoridae. It is found in north-eastern North America, south to North Carolina and west to Kansas and Texas.

The wingspan is 21–30 mm. Adults resemble a bird-dropping.

The larvae feed on Quercus alba and related species. They have also been recorded on Betula species.
