= Quercus robur subsp. imeretina =

Conservation status
- Vulnerable (IUCN 2.3)

Scientific classification
- Kingdom: Plantae
- Clade: Embryophytes
- Clade: Tracheophytes
- Clade: Angiosperms
- Clade: Eudicots
- Clade: Rosids
- Order: Fagales
- Family: Fagaceae
- Genus: Quercus
- Species: Q. robur
- Subspecies: Q. r. subsp. imeretina

Trinomial name
- Quercus robur subsp. imeretina (Steven ex Woronow) Menitsky

Synonyms
- Quercus erucifolia var. imeretina (Steven ex Woronow) O.Schwarz; Quercus imeretina Steven ex Woronow; Quercus pedunculata var. brevipetiolata Medw.; Quercus sessiliflora var. tcharachensis Albov

Subspecies of English oak

Quercus robur subsp. imeretina, the Imeretian oak, is a Tertiary relict species of flowering plant in the family Fagaceae. It is native to West Caucasus. Along with Quercus hartwissiana and Quercus petraea subsp. iberica, it creates forests up to 300 meters. As relatively significant woodland, it is represented only in the Imereti region in Georgia. Along with Zelkova carpinifolia, it is protected in Ajameti Managed Reserve. It is included in the IUCN Red List. It has experienced strong anthropogenic influences, like harvesting for timber, which is the source of its rarity.

== Description ==
Imeretian oak, being a subspecies of English oak, has pedunculate acorns and often grows 2 acorns per stalk. It grows well in clayey soils, and does not grow well on bad non-developed, macadam and detritus lands. Its leaves have no stalks, and its auricle is round, low and well developed. It has one dominant lobe on the top of the leaf. The color is often of a darker shade of green. It is often used as a decorative plant.

== Habitat ==
Its range includes the Colchic lowlands and some parts along the black sea in Russia. In Georgia, the regions of Abkhazia, Samegrelo-Zemo Svaneti, Racha Lechkhumi-Kvemo Svaneti, Imereti, Guria and Achara. It is more common in the eastern part of western Georgia, being the only place where it forms forests. More rarely it can be found in the northwest of the Colchic lowlands. It is spread in the alluvial plains of the river Rioni and its tributaries, less commonly around the river Khobi.
