= Trigalloylglucose =

Trigalloylglucose may refer to:

- 1,2,3-Trigalloylglucose (1,2,3-trigalloyl glucopyranoside)
- 1,2,6-Trigalloylglucose
- 1,3,6-Trigalloylglucose

Trigalloylglucoses can be found in various species of oaks like the North American white oak (Quercus alba) and European red oak (Quercus robur).
