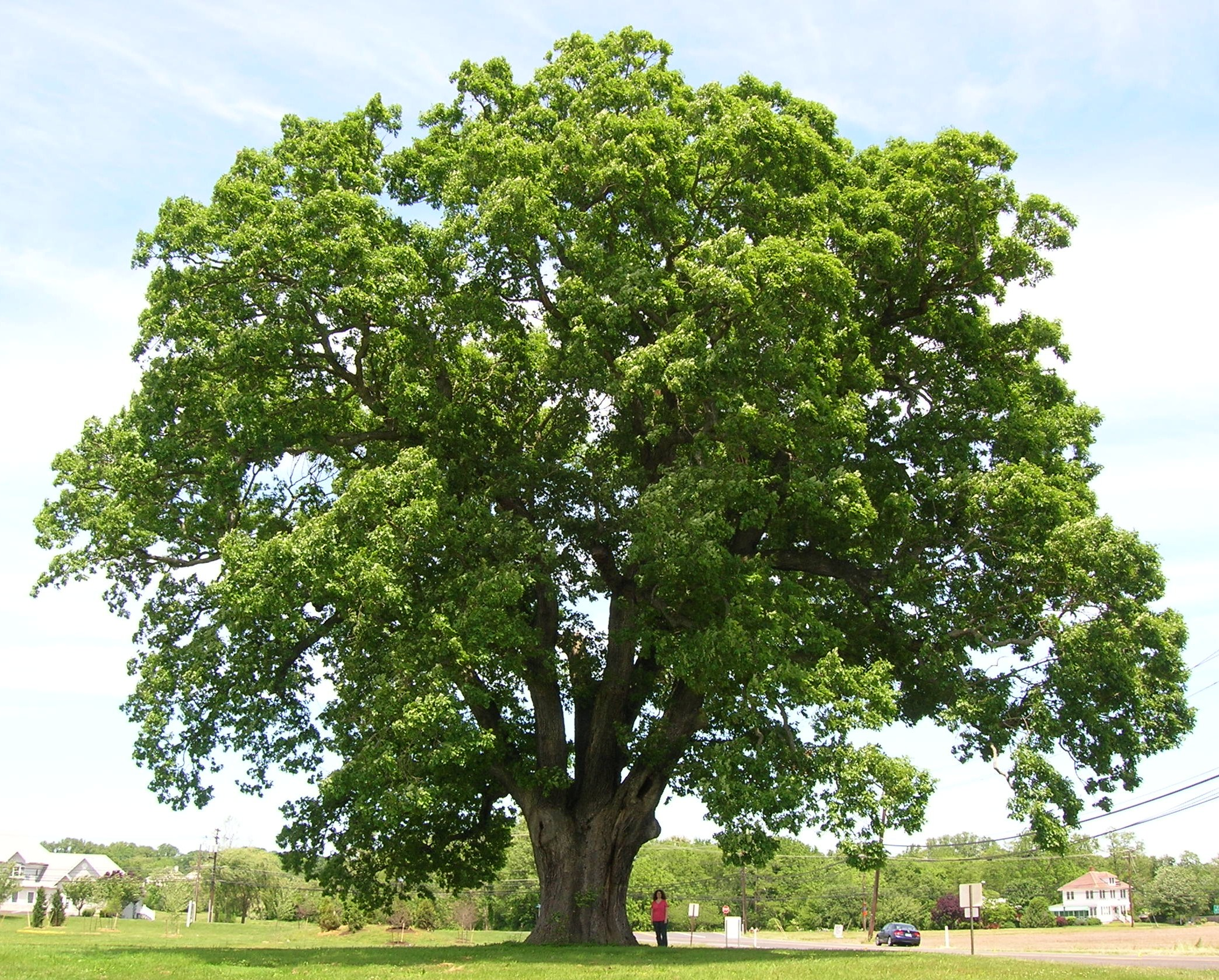
- A large white oak in New Jersey

Conservation status
- Least Concern (IUCN 3.1)

Scientific classification
- Kingdom: Plantae
- Clade: Tracheophytes
- Clade: Angiosperms
- Clade: Eudicots
- Clade: Rosids
- Order: Fagales
- Family: Fagaceae
- Genus: Quercus
- Subgenus: Quercus subg. Quercus
- Section: Quercus sect. Quercus
- Species: Q. alba

Binomial name
- Quercus alba L.
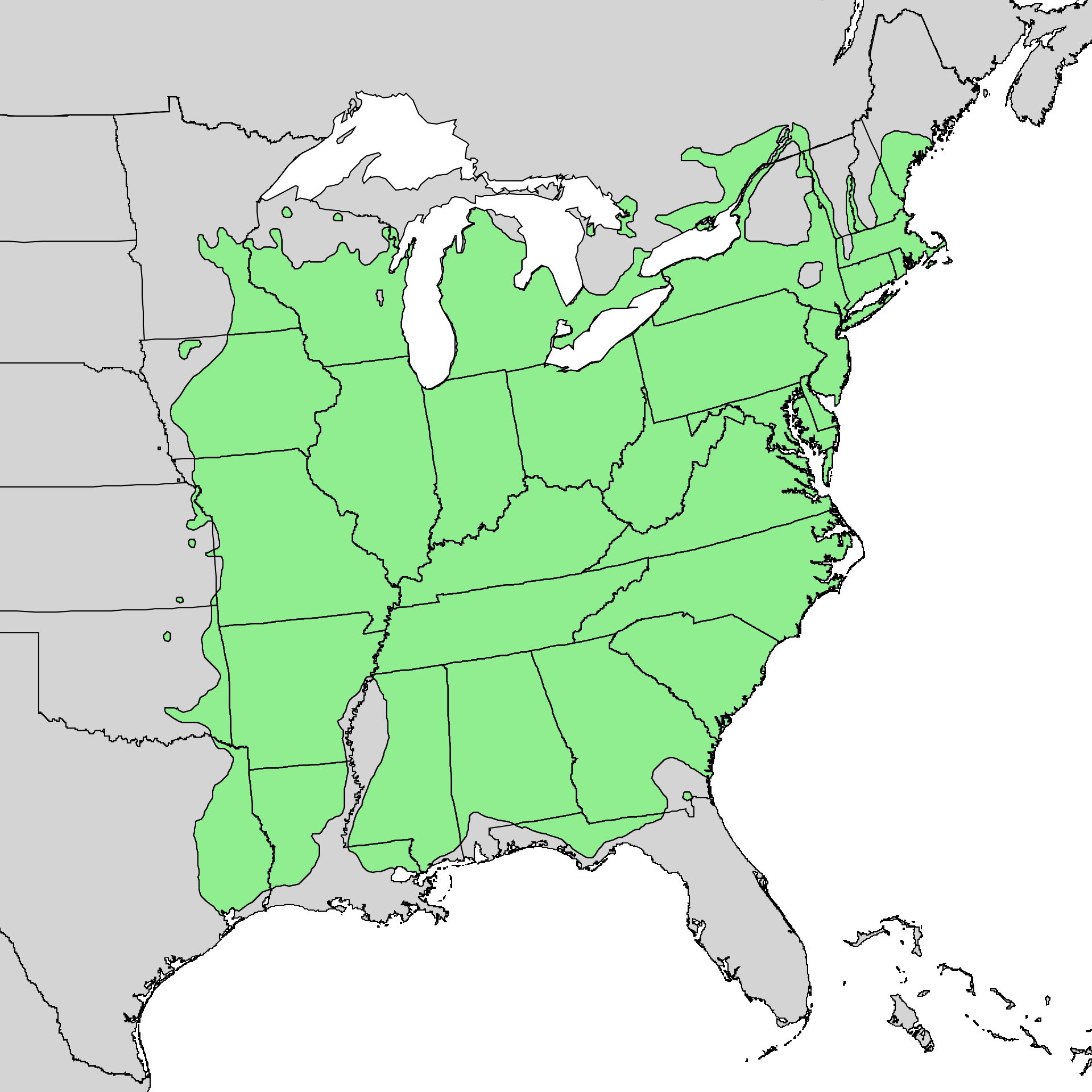
- Natural range in 1971

Synonyms
- List: Quercus alba var. heterophylla Ettingsh. & Krašan; Quercus alba f. latiloba (Sarg.) E.J.Palmer & Steyerm.; Quercus alba var. latiloba Sarg.; Quercus alba var. longigemma Trel.; Quercus alba var. microcarpa A.DC.; Quercus alba f. pinnatifida (Michx.) Rehder; Quercus alba var. pinnatifida Michx.; Quercus alba f. repanda (Michx.) Trel.; Quercus alba var. repanda Michx.; Quercus alba var. ryderi Trel.; Quercus alba var. subcaerulea Pickens & M.Pickens; Quercus alba var. subflavea Pickens & M.Pickens; Quercus alba f. sublyrata Trel.; Quercus alba f. viridis Trel.; Quercus candida Steud.; Quercus nigrescens Raf.; Quercus ramosa Dippel; Quercus repanda Michx.; Quercus retusa Raf.

= Quercus alba =

White oak

Species of oak tree

Quercus alba, the white oak, is one of the preeminent hardwoods of eastern and central North America. It is a long-lived oak, native to eastern and central North America and found from Minnesota, Ontario, Quebec, and southern Maine south as far as northern Florida and eastern Texas. Specimens have been documented to be over 450 years old.

Although called a white oak, it is very unusual to find an individual specimen with white bark; the usual color is a light gray. The name comes from the colour of the undersides of the leaves. In the forest it can reach a magnificent height and in the open it develops into a massive broad-topped tree with large branches striking out at wide angles.

== Description ==
Quercus alba typically reaches heights of 24 to 30 metres (80–100 feet) at maturity, and its canopy can become quite massive as its lower branches are apt to extend far out laterally, parallel to the ground. Trees growing in a forest will become much taller than ones in an open area which develop to be short and massive. The Mingo Oak was the tallest known white oak at over two hundred feet with a trunk height of 44.2 m (145 ft) before it was felled in 1938. It is not unusual for the crown spread of a white oak tree to be as wide as it is tall, but specimens growing at high altitudes may only become small shrubs. The bark is a light ash-gray and peels somewhat from the top, bottom and/or sides. According to Chris Bolgiano in The Appalachian Forest: A Search for Roots and Renewal, the largest tree ever cut in West Virginia was a white oak that measured 13 ft (4.0 m) thick at its base.

White oak may live 200 to 300 years, with some even older specimens known. The Wye Oak in Wye Mills, Maryland was estimated to be over 450 years old when it finally fell in a thunderstorm in 2002.

Another noted white oak was the Basking Ridge white oak in New Jersey, estimated to have been over 600 years old when it died in 2016. The tree measured 8 m (25 ft) in circumference at the base and 5 m (16 ft) in circumference 1.2 m (4 ft) above the ground. The tree was 23 m (75 ft) tall, and its branches spread over 38 m (125 ft) from tip to tip. The oak, claimed to be the oldest in the United States, began showing signs of poor health in the mid-2010s. The tree was taken down in 2017.

Sexual maturity begins at around 20 years, but the tree does not produce large crops of acorns until its 50th year and the amount varies from year to year. Acorns deteriorate quickly after ripening, the germination rate being only 10% for six-month-old seeds. As the acorns are prime food for insects and other animals, all may be consumed in years of small crops, leaving none that would become new trees. The acorns are usually sessile, and grow to 15 to 25 mm (1/2–1 in) in length, falling in early October.

In spring, the young leaves are delicate, silvery pink, and covered with a soft blanket-like down. The petioles are short, and the clustered leaves close to the ends of the shoots are pale green and downy, resulting in the entire tree having a misty, frosty look. This condition continues for several days, passing through the opalescent changes of soft pink, silvery white, and finally, yellow green. The leaves grow to be 12.5 to 21.5 centimetres (5–8 1/2 inches) long and 7 to 11.5 centimetres (2 3/4–4 1/2 in) wide and have a deep glossy green upper surface. They usually turn red or brown in autumn, but depending on climate, site, and individual tree genetics, some trees are nearly always red, or even purple in autumn. Some dead leaves may remain on the tree throughout winter until very early spring. The lobes can be shallow, extending less than halfway to the midrib, or deep and somewhat branching.

Quercus alba is sometimes confused with the swamp white oak, a closely related species, and the bur oak. The white oak hybridizes freely with the bur oak, the post oak, and the chestnut oak.

Detailed description

- Bark: Light gray, varying to dark gray and to white; shallow, fissured and scaly. Branchlets start out as bright green, later turn reddish-green, and finally, light gray. A distinguishing feature of this tree is that a little over halfway up the trunk, the bark tends to form overlapping scales that are easily noticed and aid in identification.
- Wood: Light brown with paler sapwood; strong, tough, heavy, fine-grained and durable.
- Winter buds: Reddish brown, obtuse, 3 mm (1/8 in) long.
- Leaves: Alternate, 13–23 cm (5–9 in) long, 7.5–10 cm (3–4 in) wide. Obovate or oblong, seven to nine-lobed, usually seven-lobed with rounded lobes and rounded sinuses; lobes destitute of bristles; sinuses sometimes deep, sometimes shallow. On young trees the leaves are often repand. They come out of the bud conduplicate, are bright red above, pale below, and covered with white tomentum. The reddish hue fades in a week or less, and they become silvery greenish, white, and shiny; when mature, they are thin, bright yellow-green, shiny or dull above, pale, glaucous or smooth below; the midrib is stout and yellow, primary veins are conspicuous. In late autumn the leaves turn a deep red and drop, or on young trees, remain on the branches throughout winter. Petioles are short, stout, grooved, and flattened. Stipules are linear and caducous.
- Flowers: Appear in May when leaves are one-third grown. Staminate flowers are borne in hairy aments 6.5–7.5 cm (2 1/2–3 in) long; the calyx is bright yellow, hairy, and six to eight-lobed with lobes shorter than the stamens; anthers are yellow. Pistillate flowers are borne on short peduncles; involucral scales are hairy and reddish; calyx lobes are acute; stigmas are bright red. Extrafloral nectaries have been reported for this species.
- Acorns: Annual, sessile or stalked; nut ovoid or oblong, round at apex, light brown, shiny, 20–25 mm (3/4–1 in) long; cap is cup-shaped, encloses about one-fourth of the nut, tomentose on the outside, tuberculate at base, scales with short obtuse tips becoming smaller and thinner toward the rim. White Oak acorns (referring to Q. alba and all its close relatives) have no epigeal dormancy and germination begins readily without any treatment. In most cases, the oak root sprouts in the fall, with the leaves and stem appearing the next spring. The acorns take only one growing season to develop unlike the red oak group, which require two years for maturation.
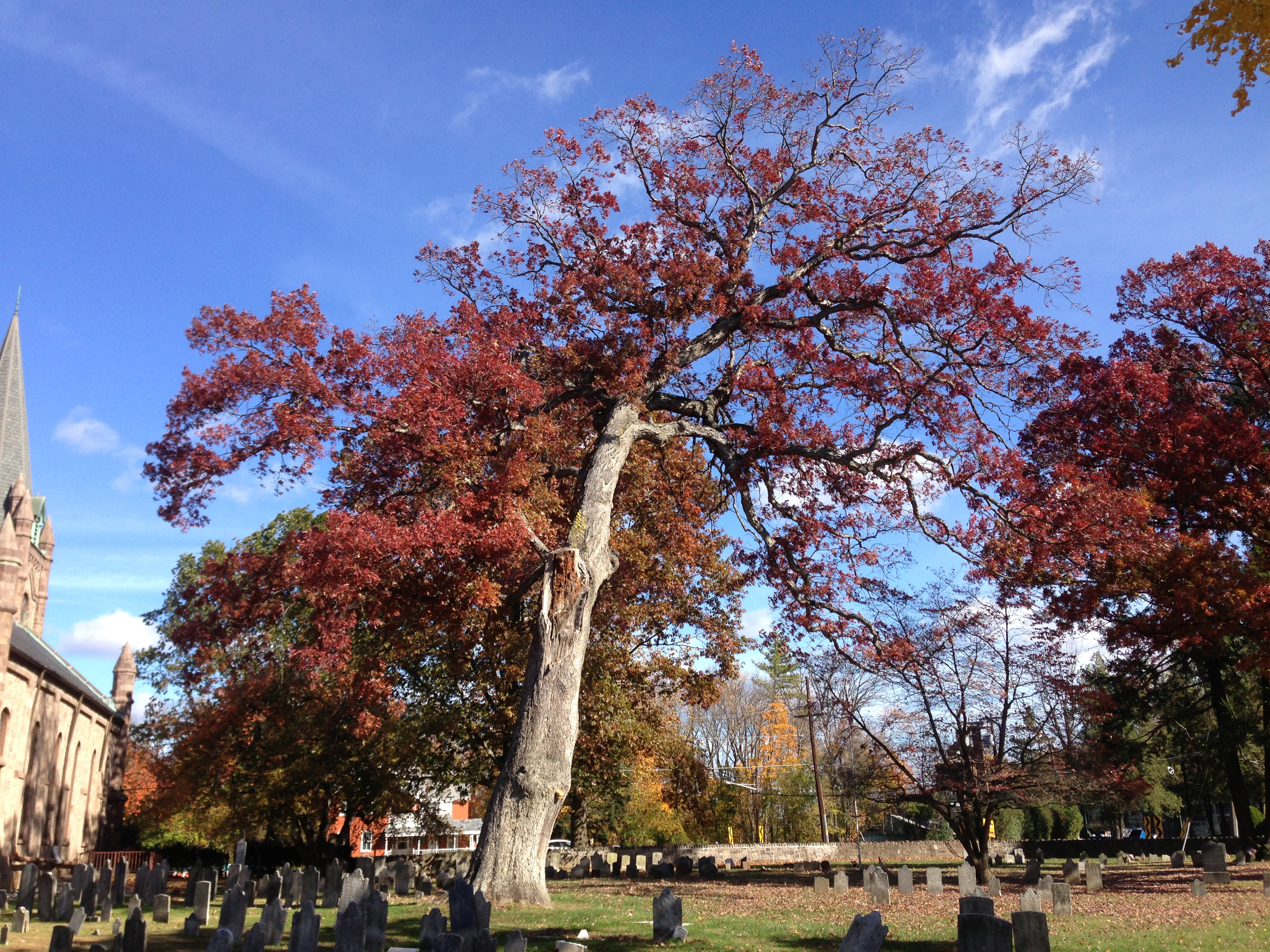
Large white oak in a Revolutionary War-era cemetery (Ewing, New Jersey, 2014)

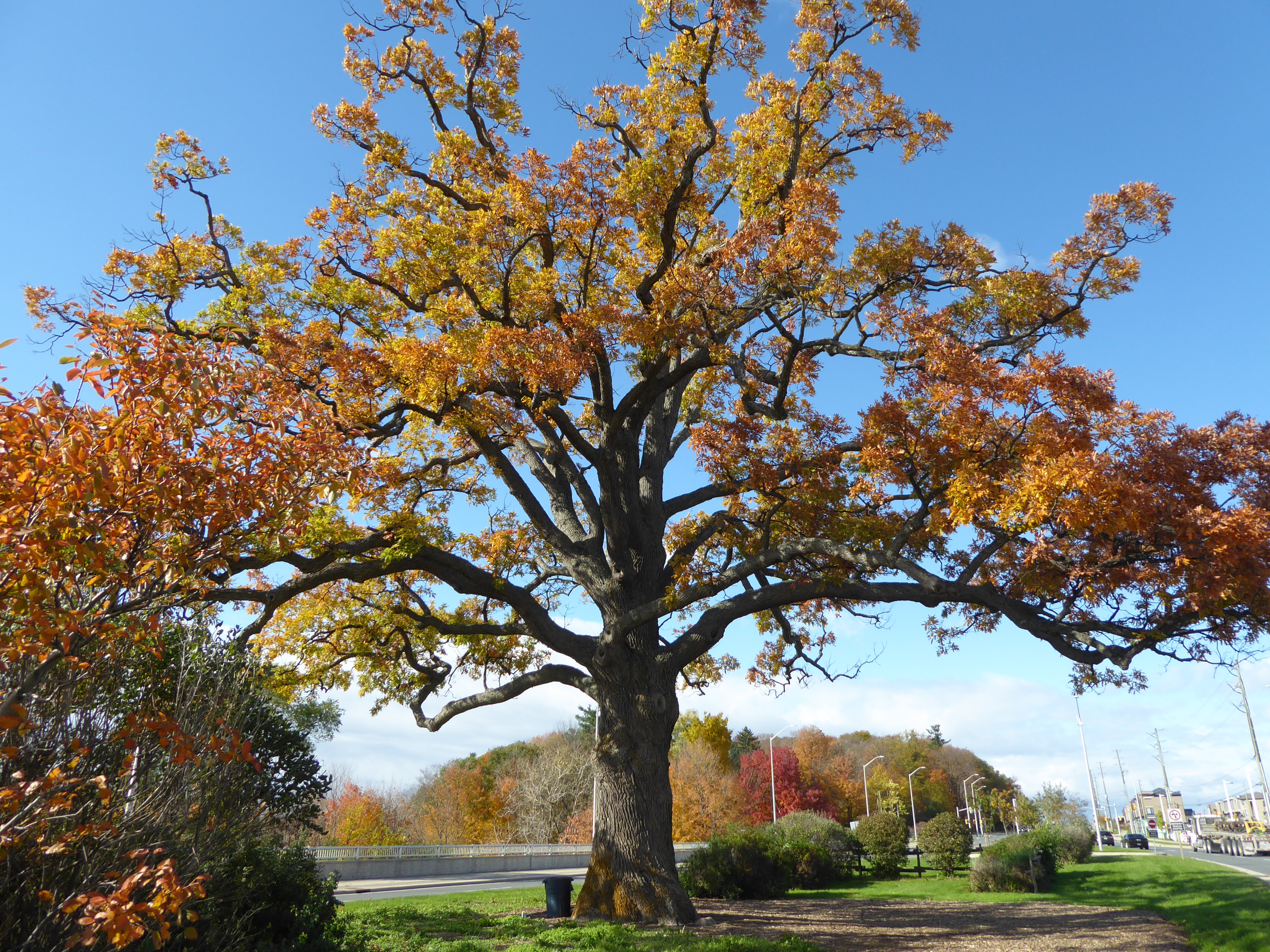
A large white oak in Bronte, Oakville, Ontario, dating to 1750.

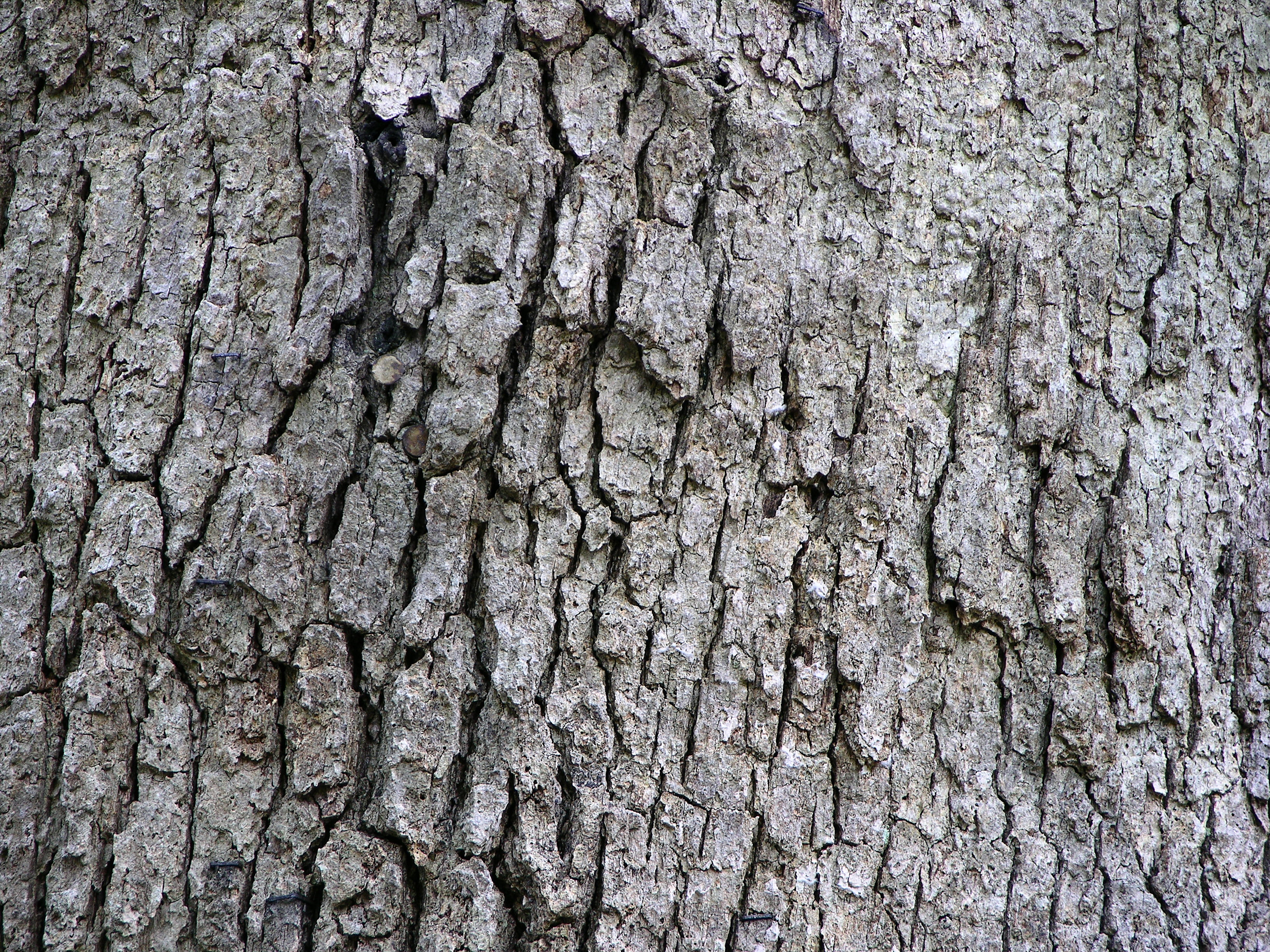
Bark on a large trunk

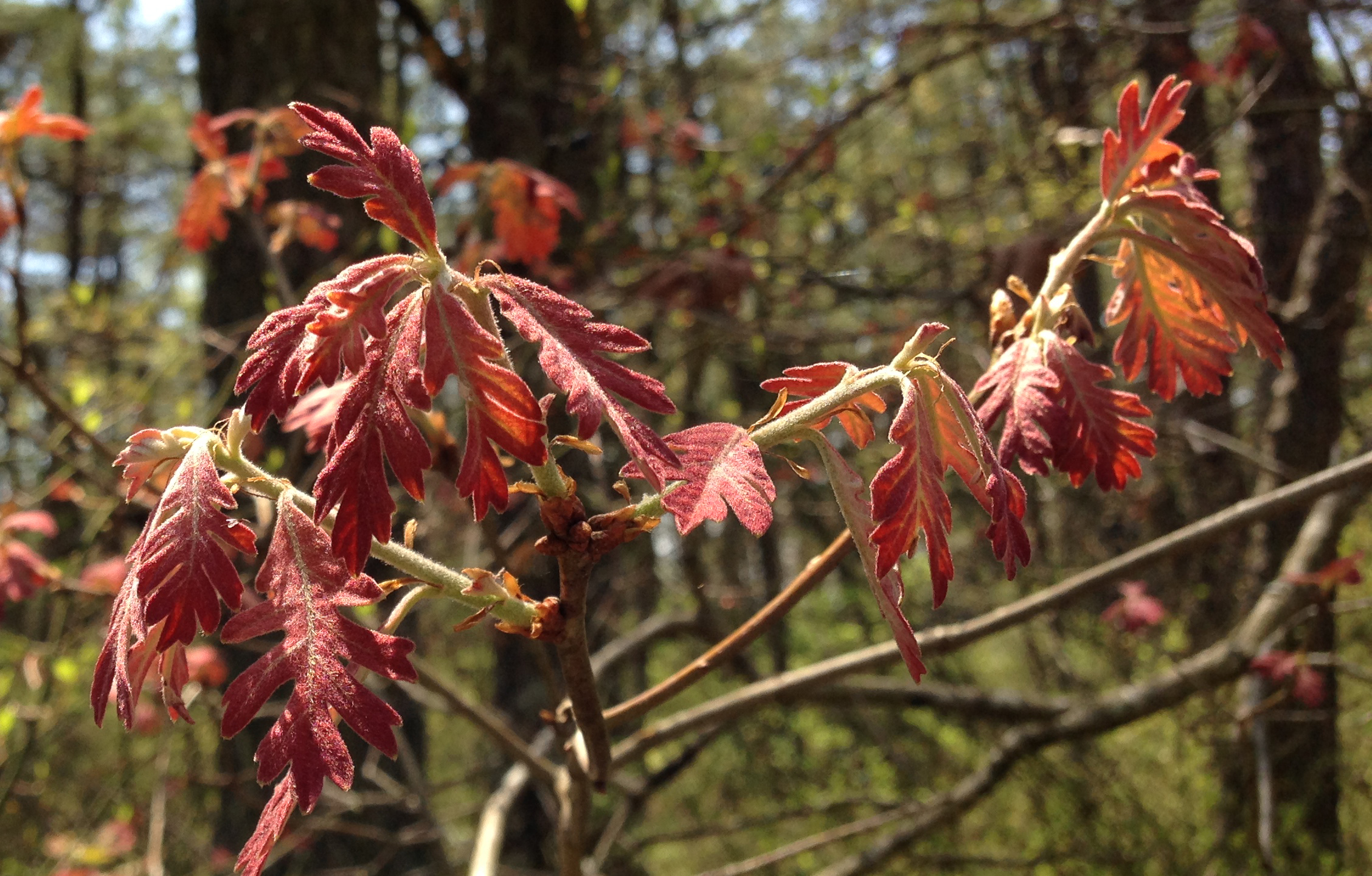
New foliage of Quercus alba

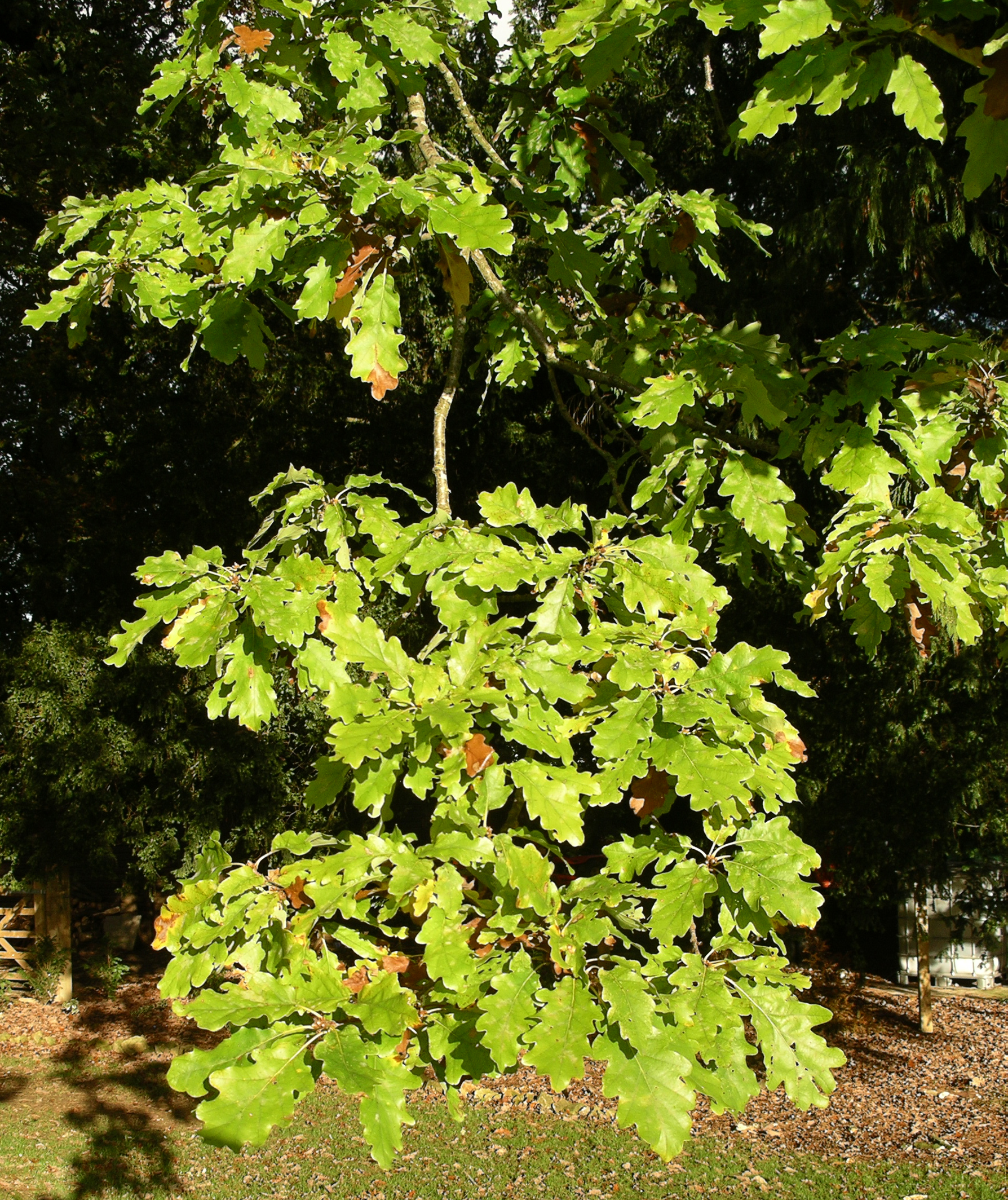
White oak foliage

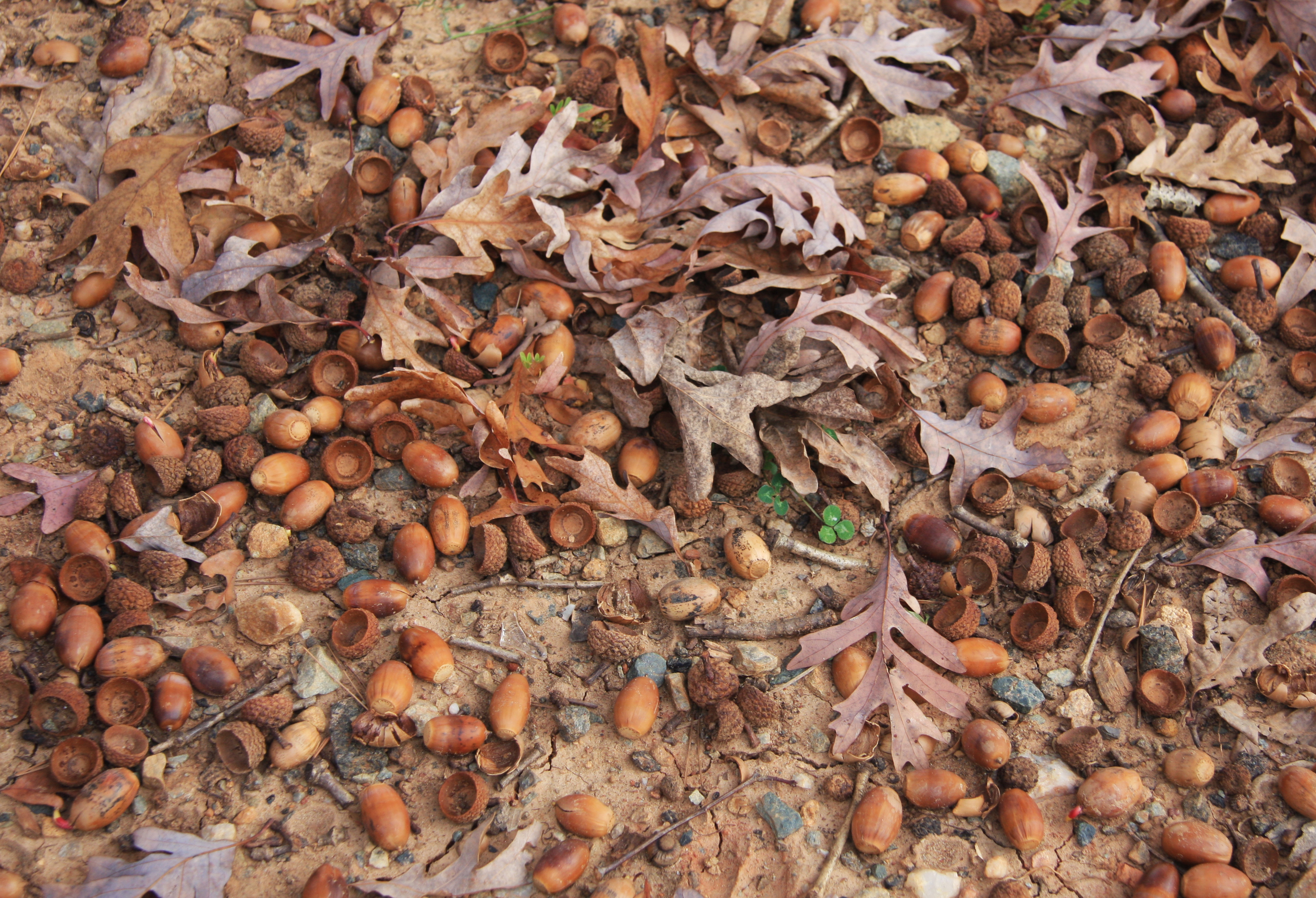
Fallen acorns from prolific tree

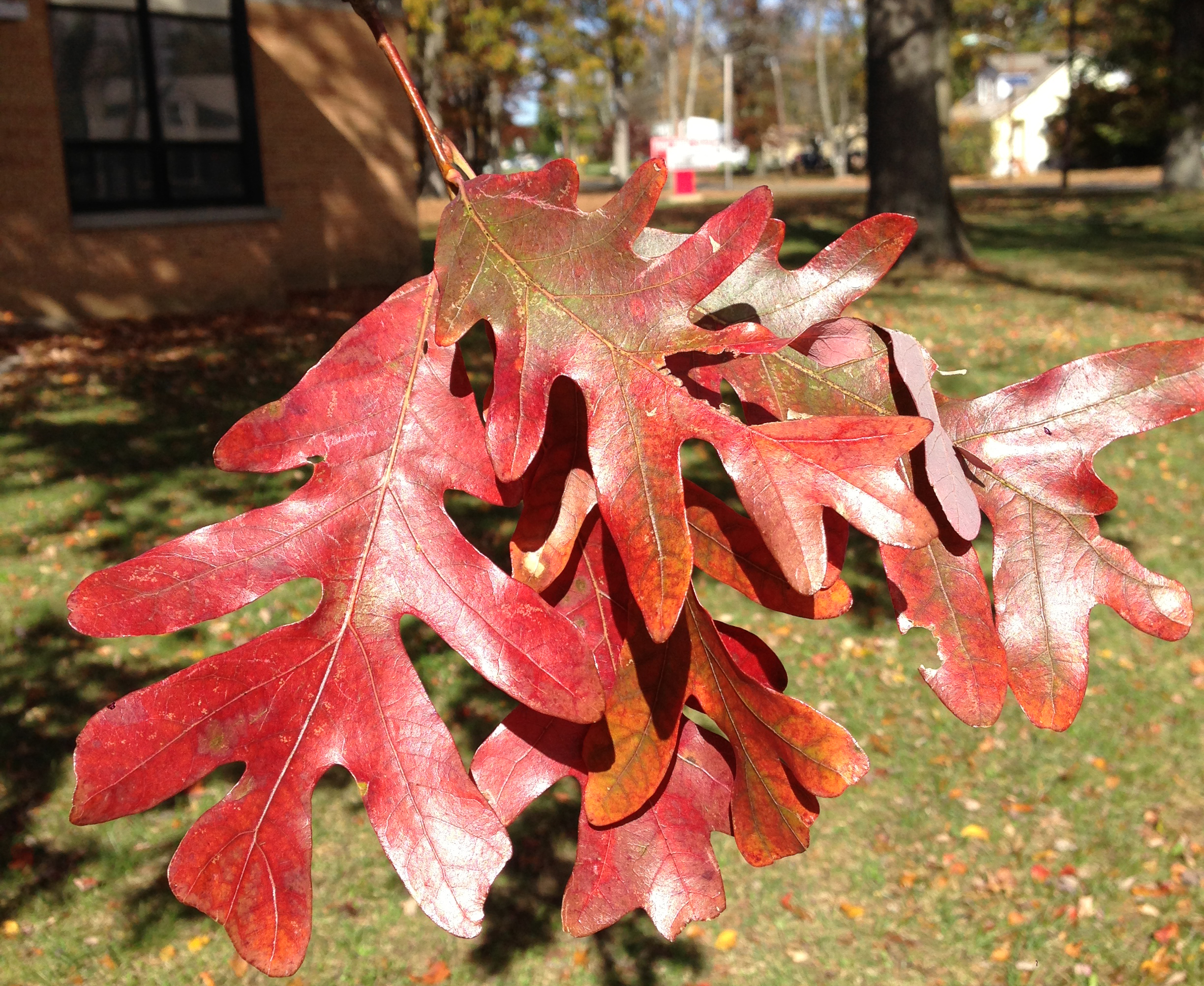
Autumn foliage

=== Chemistry ===
Grandinin/roburin E, castalagin/vescalagin, gallic acid, monogalloyl glucose (glucogallin) and valoneic acid dilactone, digalloyl glucose, trigalloyl glucose, ellagic acid rhamnose, quercitrin and ellagic acid are phenolic compounds found in Q. alba.

The haplotype-resolved chromosome-scale genome of Q. alba was published in 2025.

== Distribution ==
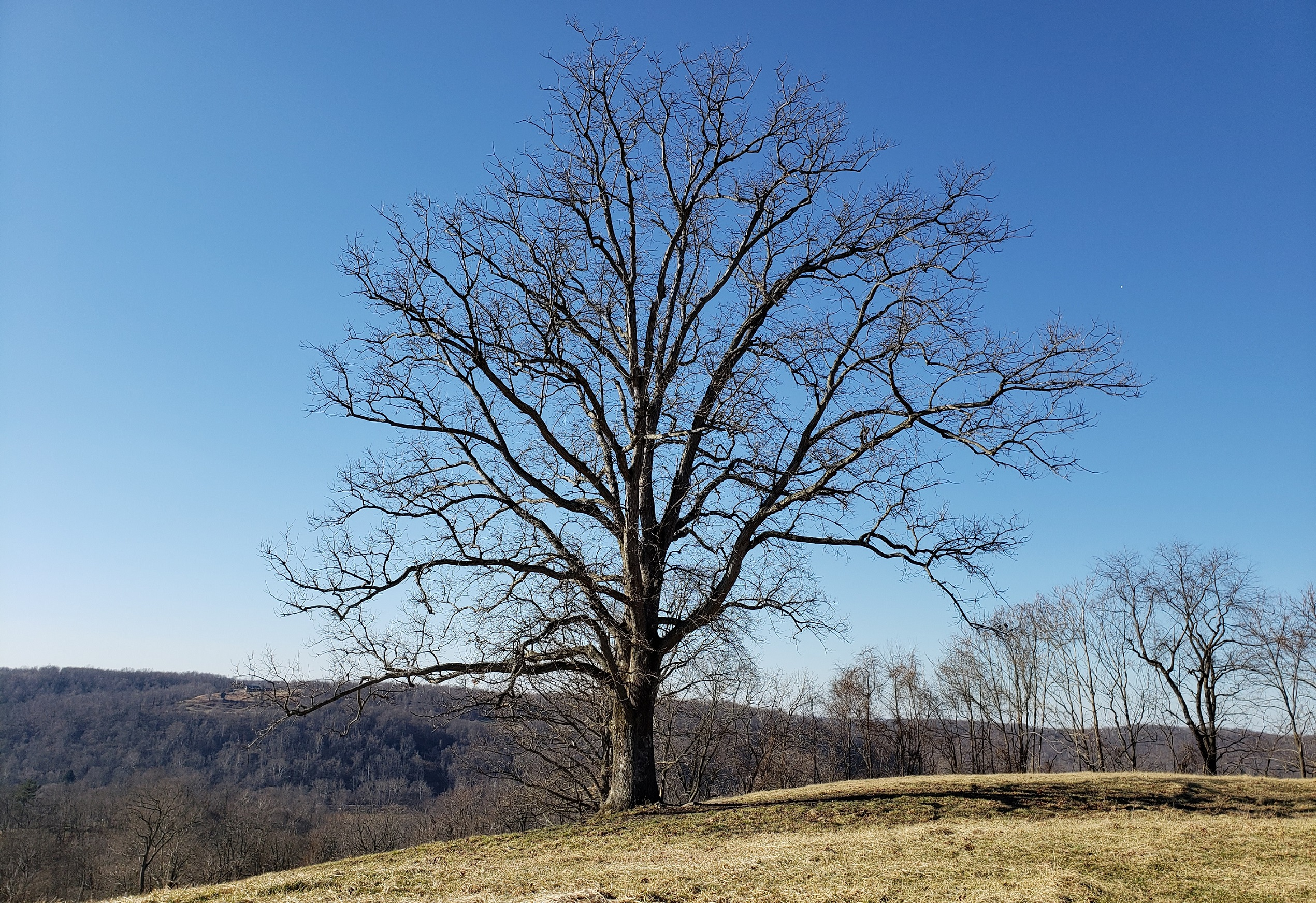
White Oak in the Appalachian Foothills of SW Pennsylvania

Quercus alba is fairly tolerant of a variety of habitats, and may be found on ridges, in valleys, and in between, in dry and moist habitats, and in moderately acid and alkaline soils. It is mainly a lowland tree, but reaches altitudes of 1,600 m (5,249 ft) in the Appalachian Mountains. It is often a component of the forest canopy in an oak-heath forest.

Frequent fires in the Central Plains region of the United States prevented oak forests, including Q. alba, from expanding into the Midwest. However, a decrease in the frequency of these natural fires after European settlement caused rapid expansion of oak forests into the Great Plains, negatively affecting the natural prairie vegetation.

== Uses ==
=== Cultivation ===
Quercus alba is cultivated as an ornamental tree somewhat infrequently due to its slow growth and ultimately huge size. It is not tolerant of urban pollution and road salt; and due to its large taproot, it is unsuited for a street tree or parking strips/islands.

=== Food ===
The acorns are much less bitter than the acorns of red oaks. They can be eaten by humans but, if bitter, may need to have the tannins leached. They are also a valuable wildlife food, notably for turkeys, wood ducks, pheasants, grackles, jays, nuthatches, thrushes, woodpeckers, rabbits, squirrels, deer, and black bear. The white oak is the only known food plant of the Bucculatrix luteella and Bucculatrix ochrisuffusa caterpillars.

The young shoots of many eastern oak species are readily eaten by deer. Dried oak leaves are also occasionally eaten by white-tailed deer in the fall or winter. Rabbits often browse twigs and can girdle stems.

=== Woodcraft ===
White oak has tyloses that give the wood a closed cellular structure, making it water- and rot-resistant. Because of this characteristic, white oak is used by coopers to make wine and whiskey barrels as the wood resists leaking. It has also been used in construction, shipbuilding, agricultural implements and in the interior finishing of houses. White oak splints have been used historically by Native Americans for basketry.

White oak logs feature prominent medullary rays which produce a distinctive, decorative ray and fleck pattern when the wood is quarter sawn. Quarter sawn white oak was a signature wood used in mission style oak furniture by Gustav Stickley in the Craftsman style of the Arts and Crafts movement.

USS Constitution is made of white oak and southern live oak, conferring additional resistance to cannon fire. Reconstructive wood replacement of white oak parts comes from a special grove of Quercus alba known as the "Constitution Grove" at Naval Surface Warfare Center Crane Division.

=== Musical instruments ===
Deering Banjo Company have made several 5-string banjos using white oak - including members of the Vega series, the White Lotus, and the limited edition 40th anniversary model. White Oak has a mellower timbre than more traditionally used maple, and yet still has enough power and projection to not require a metal tone ring.

=== Oak barrels ===
Barrels made of American white oak are commonly used for oak aging of wine, in which the wood is noted for imparting strong flavors. Also, by federal regulation, bourbon whiskey must be aged in charred new oak (generally understood to mean specifically American white oak) barrels.

== Culture ==
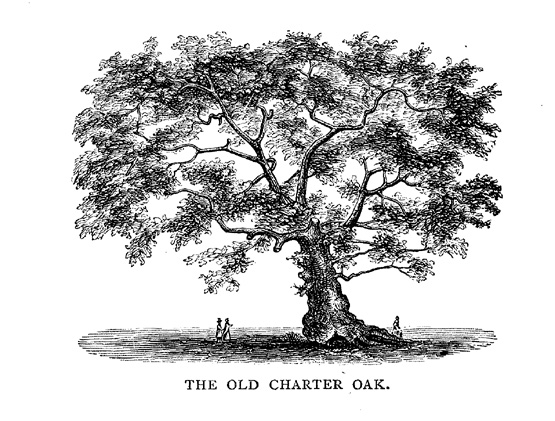
The Old Charter Oak

White oak has served as the official state tree of Illinois after selection by a vote of school children. There are two "official" white oaks serving as state trees, one located on the grounds of the governor's mansion, and the other in a schoolyard in the town of Rochelle. The white oak is also the state tree of Connecticut and Maryland. The Wye Oak, probably the oldest living white oak until it fell because of a thunderstorm on June 6, 2002, was the honorary state tree of Maryland.

Being the subject of a legend as old as the colony itself, the Charter Oak of Hartford, Connecticut is one of the most famous white oaks in America. An image of the tree now adorns the reverse side of the Connecticut state quarter.

The white oak from the movie The Shawshank Redemption, known as the "Shawshank tree" and the "Tree of Hope", was estimated to be more than 200 years old when it fell. The tree is seen during the last ten minutes of the movie. As the movie gained fame, the tree became popular as well, and used to attract tens of thousands of movie fans and tourists every year. A portion of the tree came down on July 29, 2011, when the tree was split by lightning during a storm. The remaining half of the tree fell during heavy winds just short of five years later, on July 22, 2016.

The Bedford Oak is a 500-year-old white oak tree that sits in the town of Bedford in New York. It is the mascot of the town. It sits at the corner of the Hook Road and the old Bedford Road (now Cantitoe Street). The ground the tree stands on was deeded to the Town of Bedford in 1942 by Harold Whitman in memory of his wife, Georgia Squires Whitman. It has seen Westchester history from Native American settlements to the Revolutionary War to modern times.

The video game Ace Attorney Investigations: Miles Edgeworth features a character named Quercus Alba who bears some resemblance to the white oak and plants in general.

== Threats to oaks ==
Insects and the damage they cause account for the greatest amount of threat to acorn production from white oaks, particularly nut weevils, moth larvae, and gall forming cynipids.

== See also ==
- Central and southern Appalachian montane oak forest
- Creek Council Oak Tree, historic landmark representing Tulsa, Oklahoma's founding by the Lochapoka Tribal Town of the Creek Nation
- Door Tree, historic and unique white oak in Hamden, Connecticut (lost to vandalism in 2019)
- Linden Oak, possibly the largest living white oak in the United States when it died in 2022.
