= O. africana =

O. africana may refer to:

- Ochrolechia africana, a plant species in the genus Ochrolechia found in Australia
- Olea africana, a synonym for Olea europaea subsp. cuspidata, a plant species

== See also ==
- Africana (disambiguation)
