= O. minuta =

O. minuta may refer to:

- Ochrolechia minuta - species of crustose lichen
- Ohridohauffenia minuta - species of minute freshwater hydrobiid gastropod
- Olivella minuta - species of small sea snail
- Oloessa minuta - species of beetle
- Oncideres minuta - species of beetle
- Oopsacas minuta - a species of glass sponge
- Oreophryne minuta - species of frog
