= Traditional dyes of the Scottish Highlands =

Traditional dyes of the Scottish Highlands are the native vegetable dyes used in Scottish Gaeldom.

The following are the principal dyestuffs with the colours they produce. Several of the tints are very bright, but have now been superseded for convenience of usage by various synthetic dyes. The Latin names are given where known and also the Scottish Gaelic names for various ingredients.

== Recipes ==
Many of the dyes are made from lichens, the useful ones for this purpose being known as crottle.

The process employed is to wash the thread thoroughly in urine long kept ("fual"), rinse and wash in pure water, then put into the boiling pot of dye which is kept boiling hot on the fire. The thread is lifted now and again on the end of a stick, and again plunged in until it is all thoroughly dyed. If blue, the thread is then washed in salt water, but any other colour uses fresh water.

Amateurs may wish to experiment with some of the suggestions, as urine (human or animal) is used in many recipes as a mordant. A number of the recipes used are for more than one colour, and this chart is only a guide.

=== Claret ===
- Claret – "corcar" – the cudbear lichen, Ochrolechia tartarea, scraped off rocks and steeped in urine for three months, then taken out, made into cakes, and hung in bags to dry. When used these cakes are reduced to powder, and the colour fixed with alum.

=== Black – Dubh ===
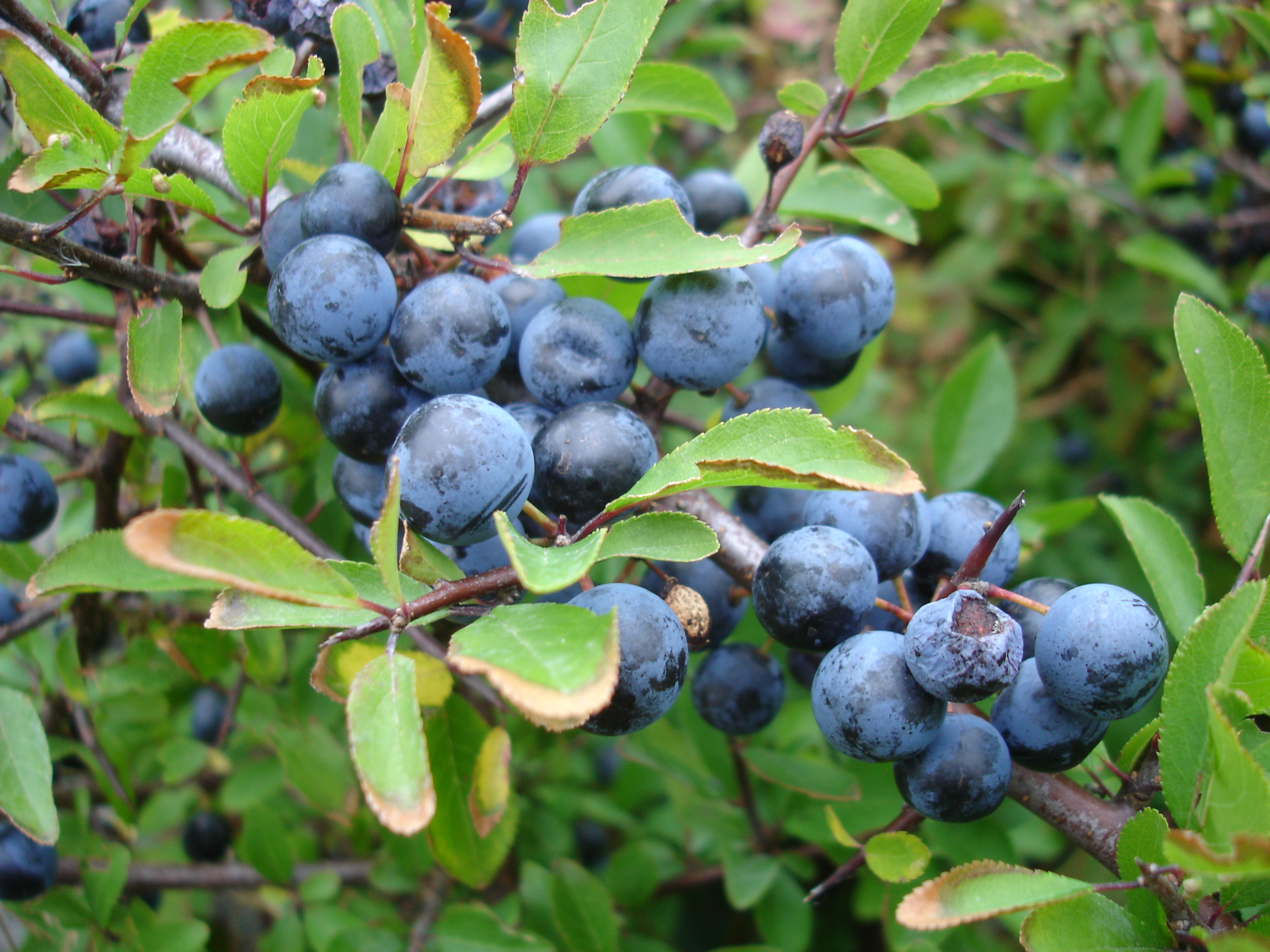
Prunus spinosa

- Black (finest) –
  - Common dock root with copperas.
  - "Darach" – oak bark and copperas
  - (also grey), "seileastair", iris root
  - "Sgìtheach", hawthorn bark with copperas
  - Alder bark with copperas
- Blue-black
  - Common sloe – Prunus spinosa – "preas nan àirneag"
  - Bearberry – Arctostaphylos uva ursi, "grainnseag"

=== Blue – Gorm ===
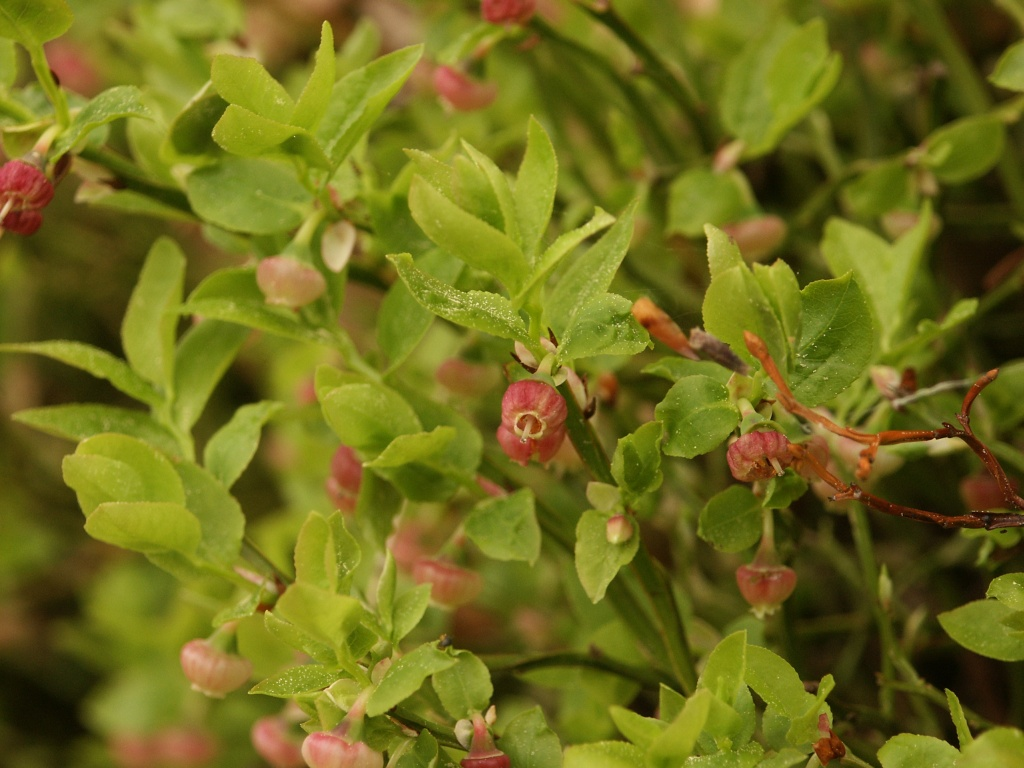
Vaccinum myrtillus

- Blue
  - Blaeberry (Vaccinium myrtillus) with alum or copperas
  - Elderberry (Sambucus nigra) with alum
  - "Ailleann" elecampane

=== Brown – Donn ===
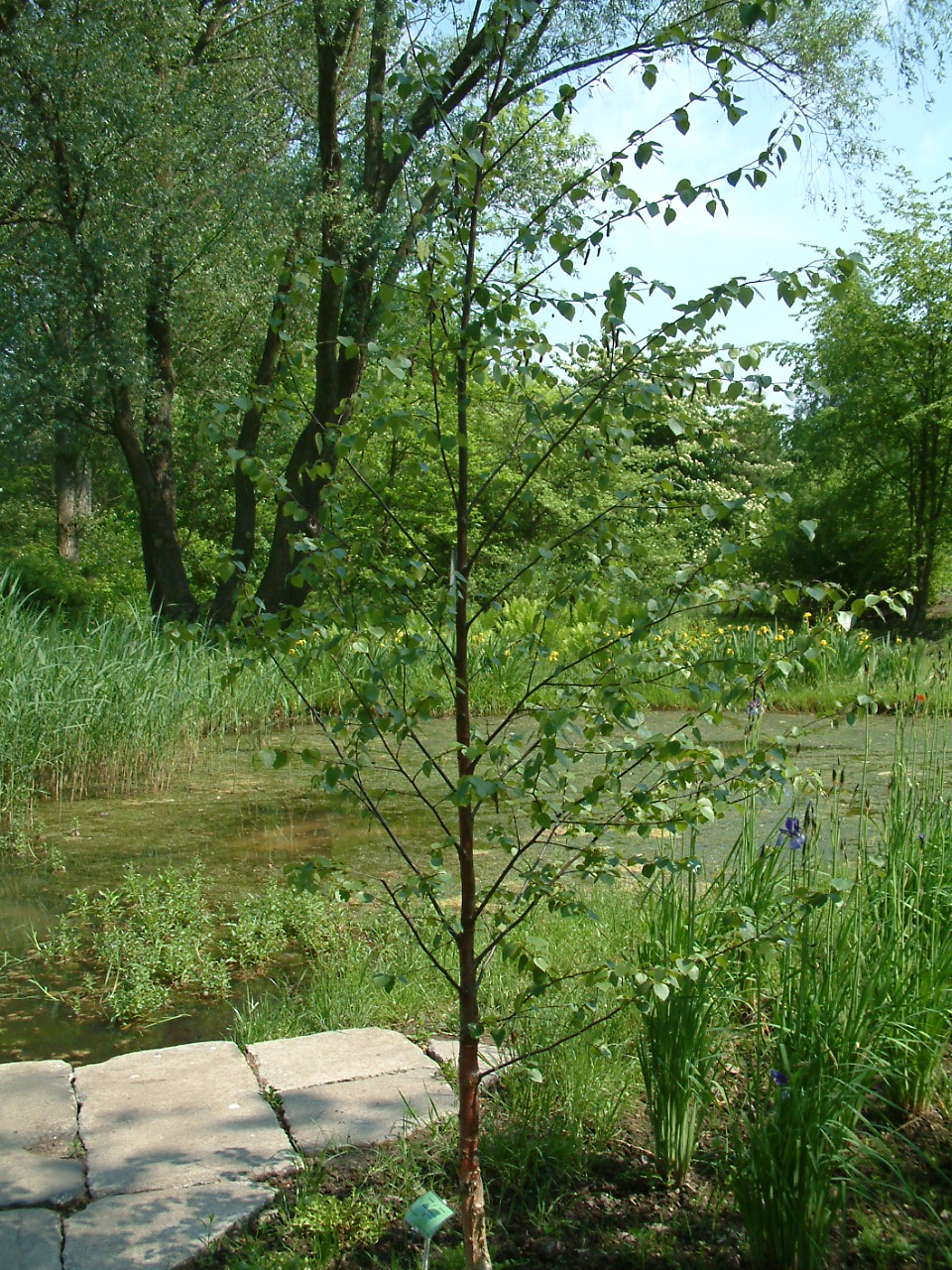
Betula

- Brown
  - Common yellow wall lichen – Xanthoria parietina
  - Dark "crotal" (type of lichen) – Parmelia cetarophilia
  - "Duileasg" (dulse), a kind of seaweed.
  - Currant with alum
- Dark chestnut-brown
  - Roots of "rabhagach", the white waterlily
- Dark brown
  - Blaeberry with nut-galls
- Reddish brown - Ruadh
  - The dark purple lichen ‘cen cerig cen du' (gun chéire gun dubh – i.e. neither crimson nor black) treated in the same way as the lichen for the claret dye.
- Philamot
  - Yellowish "crotal" (type of lichen), the colour of dead leaves – Parmelia saxatilis
- Drab or fawn
  - Birch bark, Betula pubescens

=== Green – Uaine ===
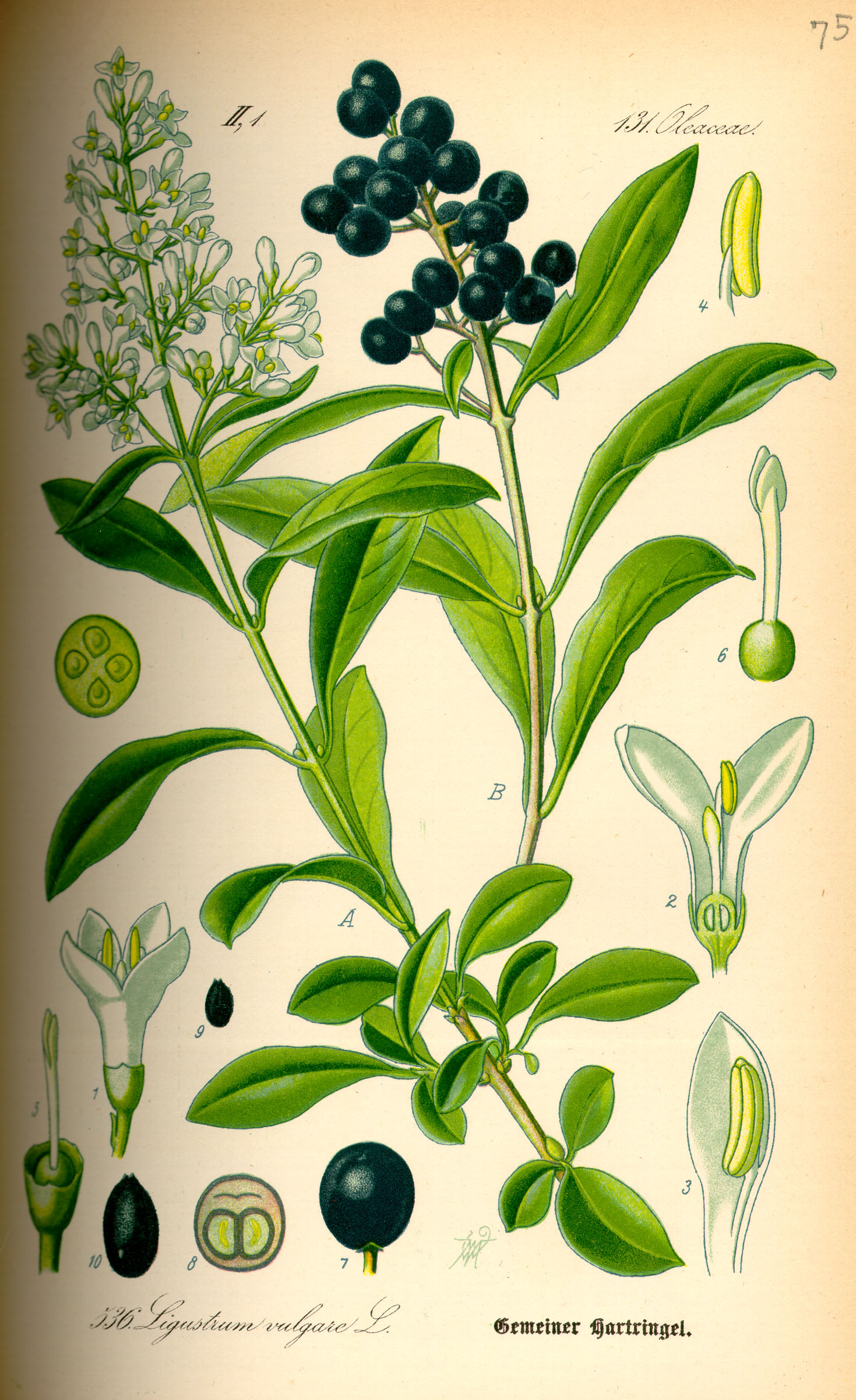
Ligustrum vulgare

- Green
  - Ripe privet berries with salt (listed for crimson too)
  - Weld Reseda luteola, "lus buidhe mòr", with indigo
  - "Rùsg conaisg", whin bark
  - Cow weed
- "Lively" green
  - Common broom
- Dark green
  - Heather, Erica cinerea, "fraoch-bhadain" with alum. The heather must be pulled before flowering and from a dark, shady place.
  - Iris leaf ("Duilleag seileisteir")

=== Magenta ===
- Magenta
  - Dandelion, Taraxacum officinale, "beàrnan-Brìde"

=== Orange – Orains/Dearg-buidhe ===
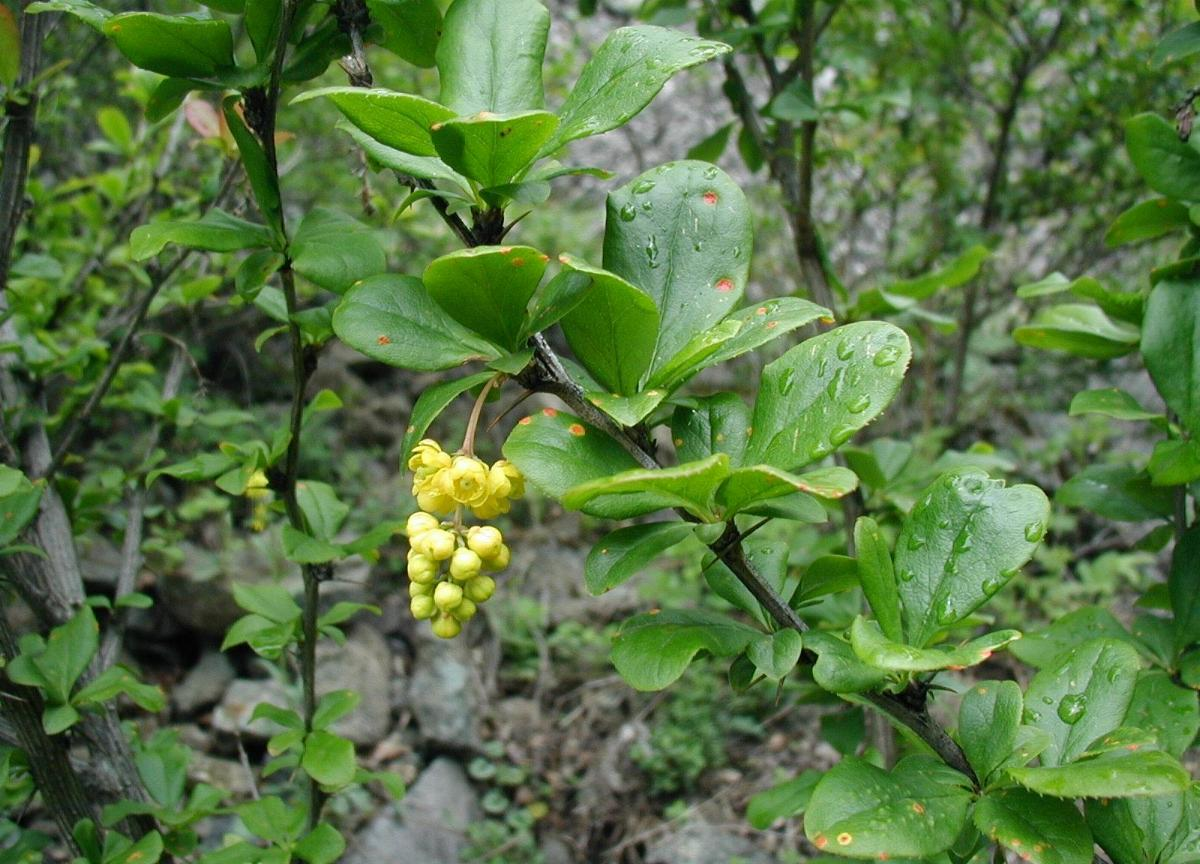
Berberis vulgaris, naturalised in Scotland

- Orange
  - Ragweed ("Stinking Billy") – Senecio jacobaea, "buaghallan"
  - Barberry root –Berberis vulgaris, "barbrag"
- Dark orange
  - Bramble –Rubus fruticosus, "preas smeur"

=== Purple – Corcar/Purpaidh ===
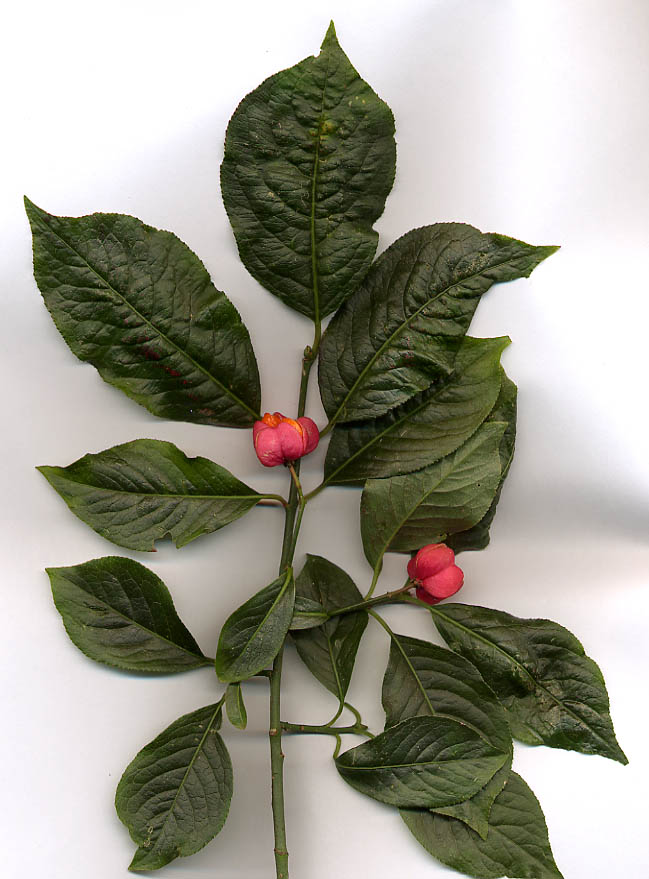
Spindle

- Purple
  - Euonymus (Spindle tree), with sal-ammoniac
  - Sundew – Drosera rotundifolia, "lus na feàrnaich"
  - Blaeberry – Vaccinium myrtillus, with alum

=== Red – Dearg ===
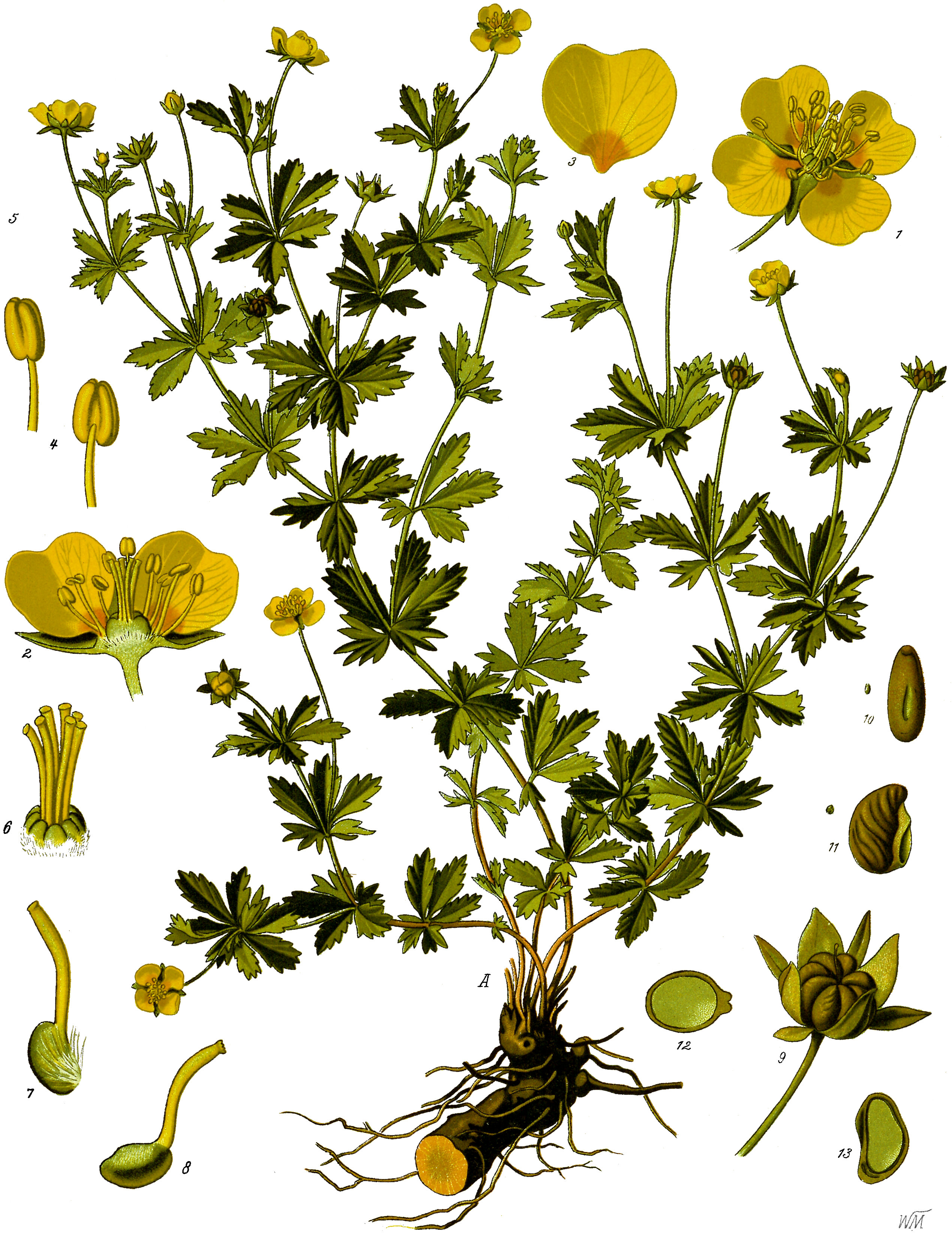
Tormentil

- Red
  - Tormentil – Potentilla tormentilla, "leanartach"
  - Rock lichen – Ramalina scopulorum, "crotal"
  - White crottle – Ochrolechia pallescens, "crotal-geal"
- Fine red
  - Rue – Galium verum, "ladies' bedstraw". A very fine red is obtained from this. Strip the bark off the roots, then boil them in water to extract the remainder of the virtue, then take the roots out and put the bark in, and boil that and the yarn together, adding alum to fix the colour.
  - Galium boreale – treated in the same way as Galium verum above.
- Purple-red
  - Blaeberry – Vaccinium myrtillus, lus nan dearc, with alum, verdigris and sal-ammoniac
- Crimson
  - "Crotal-corcar" – Ochrolechia tartarea, white and ground with urine. This was once in favour for producing a bright crimson dye.
- Scarlet
  - Limestone lichen – Urceolaria calcaria, "Crotal cloich-aoil" – used by the peasantry in limestone districts, such as Shetland.
  - Ripe privet berries with salt. (Listed for green too!)

=== Violet ===
- Violet
  - Wild cress – Nasturtium officinale "biolair"
  - Bitter vetchling – Lathyrus linifolius — cairmeal
  - Bilberries fixed with alum

=== Yellow – Buidhe ===
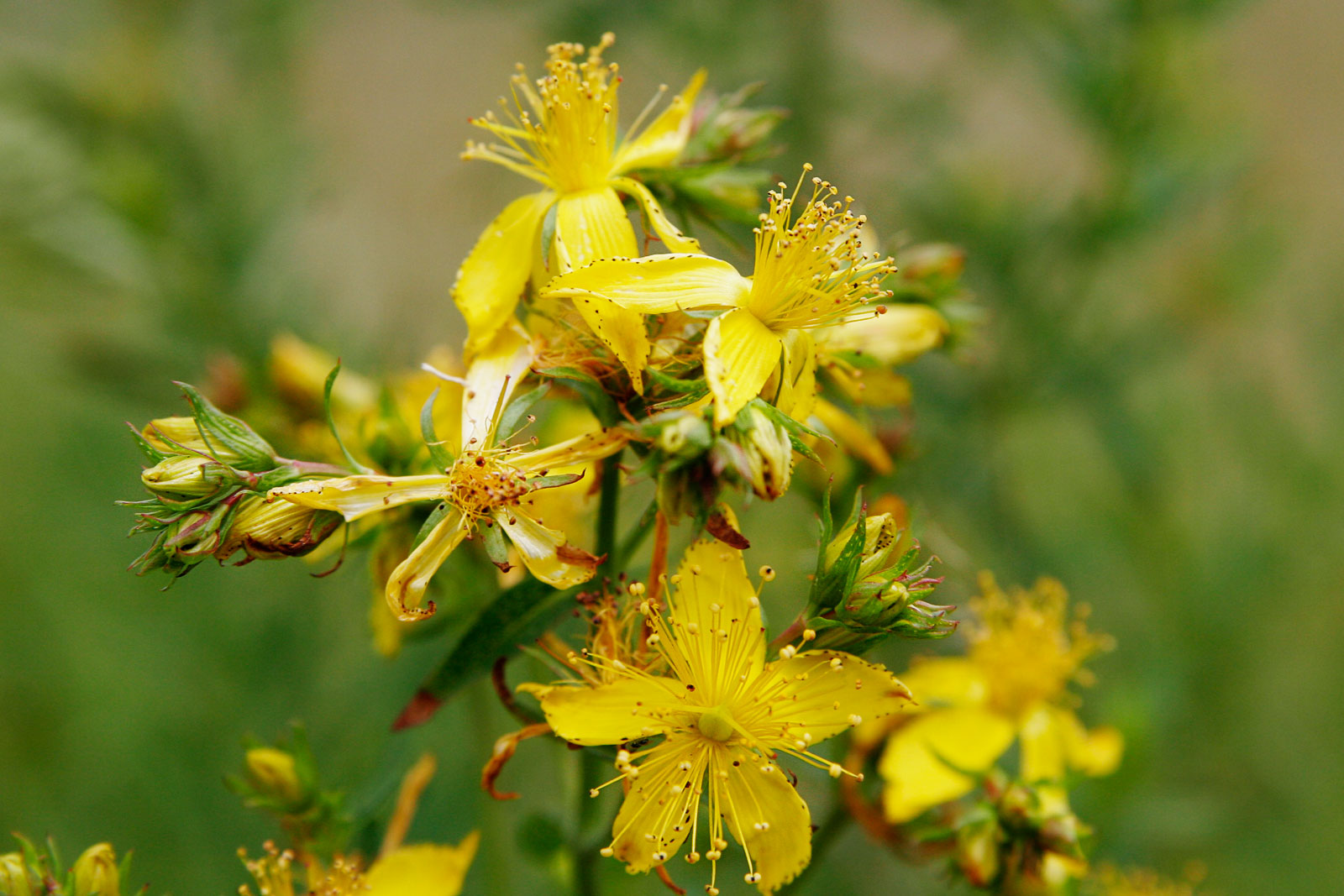
St. John's wort flowers

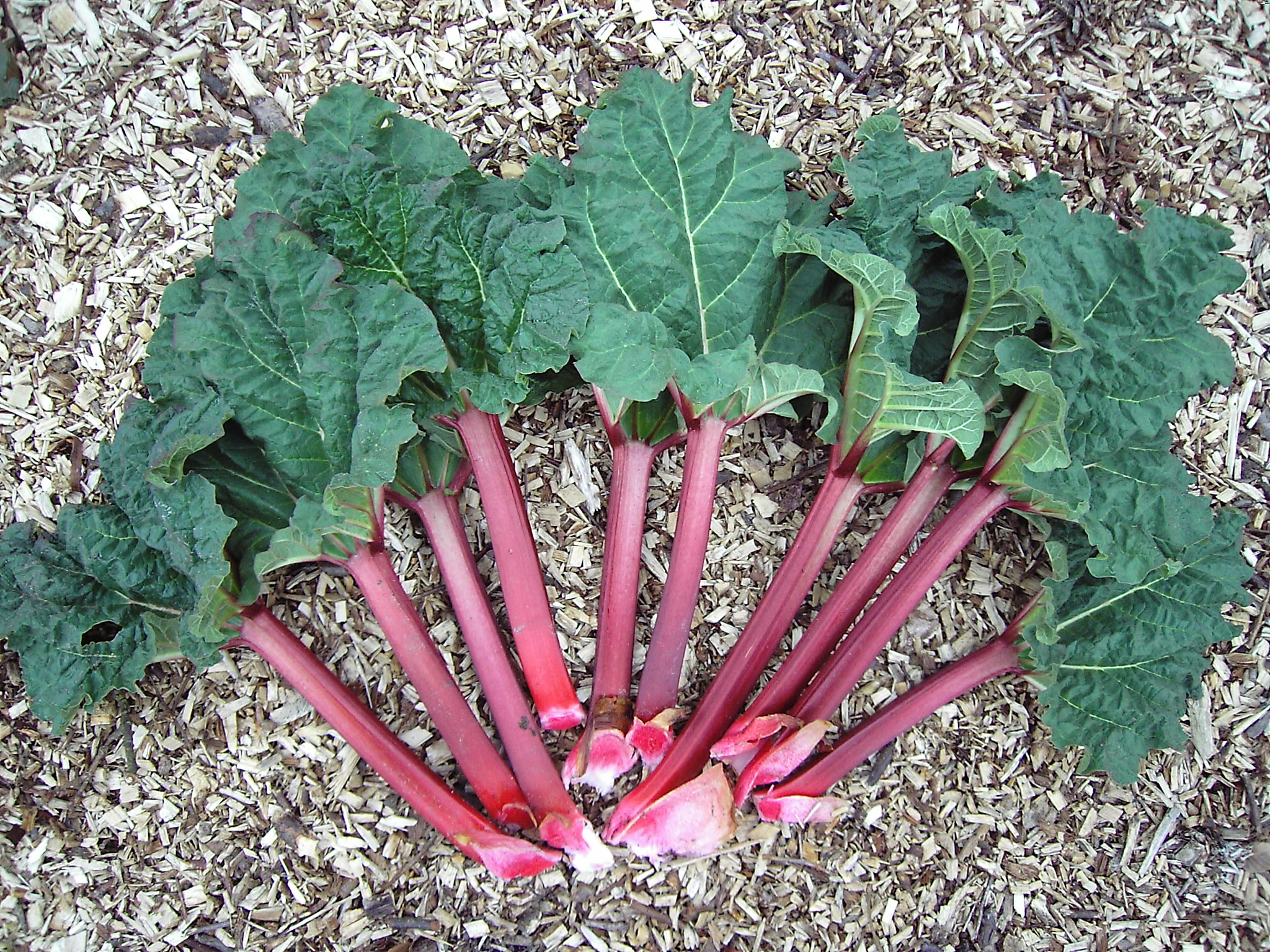
Rhubarb

- Yellow
  - Apple-tree, ash and buckthorn
  - Poplar and elm
  - Bog myrtle, Roid
  - Ash roots
  - Teazle – Dipsacus fullonum – lùs an fhùcadair/leadan
  - Bracken roots – Raineach mhòr
  - Cow weed
  - Tops and flowers of heather, Calluna, fraoch
  - Weld, Reseda luteola, "lus-buidhe mòr", dried, reduced to powder and boiled.
  - Leaves and twigs of dwarf birch, beithe-bheag
- Bright yellow
  - Sundew – Drosera rotundifolia, "lus na feàrnaich" with ammonia
- Rich Yellow
  - St John's Wort, achlasan Chalum cille, fixed with alum
- Dirty yellow
  - Peat soot. Obviously this ingredient on its own will not produce yellow
  - Rhubarb, (monk's) – Rumex alpinus – lus na purgaid

== See also ==
- Flora of Scotland
