= Cyrtinini =

Scientific classification
- Domain: Eukaryota
- Kingdom: Animalia
- Phylum: Arthropoda
- Class: Insecta
- Order: Coleoptera
- Suborder: Polyphaga
- Infraorder: Cucujiformia
- Family: Cerambycidae
- Subfamily: Lamiinae
- Tribe: Cyrtinini

Tribe of beetles

Cyrtinini is a tribe of longhorn beetles of the subfamily Lamiinae.

== Taxonomy ==
- Boricyrtinus
- Brachyrhabdus
- Cyrtillus
- Cyrtinus
- Decarthria
- Diastophya
- Gracilosphya
- Haplorhabdus
- Leptocyrtinus
- Odontorhabdus
- Oloessa
- Omosarotes
- Sciocyrtinus
- Scopadus
