= Boricyrtinus =

Scientific classification
- Domain: Eukaryota
- Kingdom: Animalia
- Phylum: Arthropoda
- Class: Insecta
- Order: Coleoptera
- Suborder: Polyphaga
- Infraorder: Cucujiformia
- Family: Cerambycidae
- Tribe: Cyrtinini
- Genus: Boricyrtinus
- Species: B. nilseni

Binomial name
- Boricyrtinus nilseni Micheli, 2003

Genus of beetles

Boricyrtinus nilseni is a species of beetle in the family Cerambycidae, and the only species in the genus Boricyrtinus. It was described by Micheli in 2003.
