= Decarthria stephensii =

Scientific classification
- Kingdom: Animalia
- Phylum: Arthropoda
- Clade: Pancrustacea
- Class: Insecta
- Order: Coleoptera
- Suborder: Polyphaga
- Infraorder: Cucujiformia
- Family: Cerambycidae
- Genus: Decarthria
- Species: D. stephensii

Binomial name
- Decarthria stephensii Hope, 1834

Species of beetle

Decarthria stephensii is a species of beetle in the family Cerambycidae. It was described by Frederick William Hope in 1834. It is known from Guadeloupe and Saint Vincent and the Grenadines.
