= Odontorhabdus =

Scientific classification
- Kingdom: Animalia
- Phylum: Arthropoda
- Class: Insecta
- Order: Coleoptera
- Suborder: Polyphaga
- Infraorder: Cucujiformia
- Family: Cerambycidae
- Tribe: Cyrtinini
- Genus: Odontorhabdus; Aurivillius, 1913

Genus of beetles

Odontorhabdus is a genus of longhorn beetles of the subfamily Lamiinae, containing the following species:

- Odontorhabdus dentipes Aurivillius, 1928
- Odontorhabdus flavicornis Aurivillius, 1928
- Odontorhabdus rechingeri Aurivillius, 1913
- Odontorhabdus teretiscapus Aurivillius, 1928
