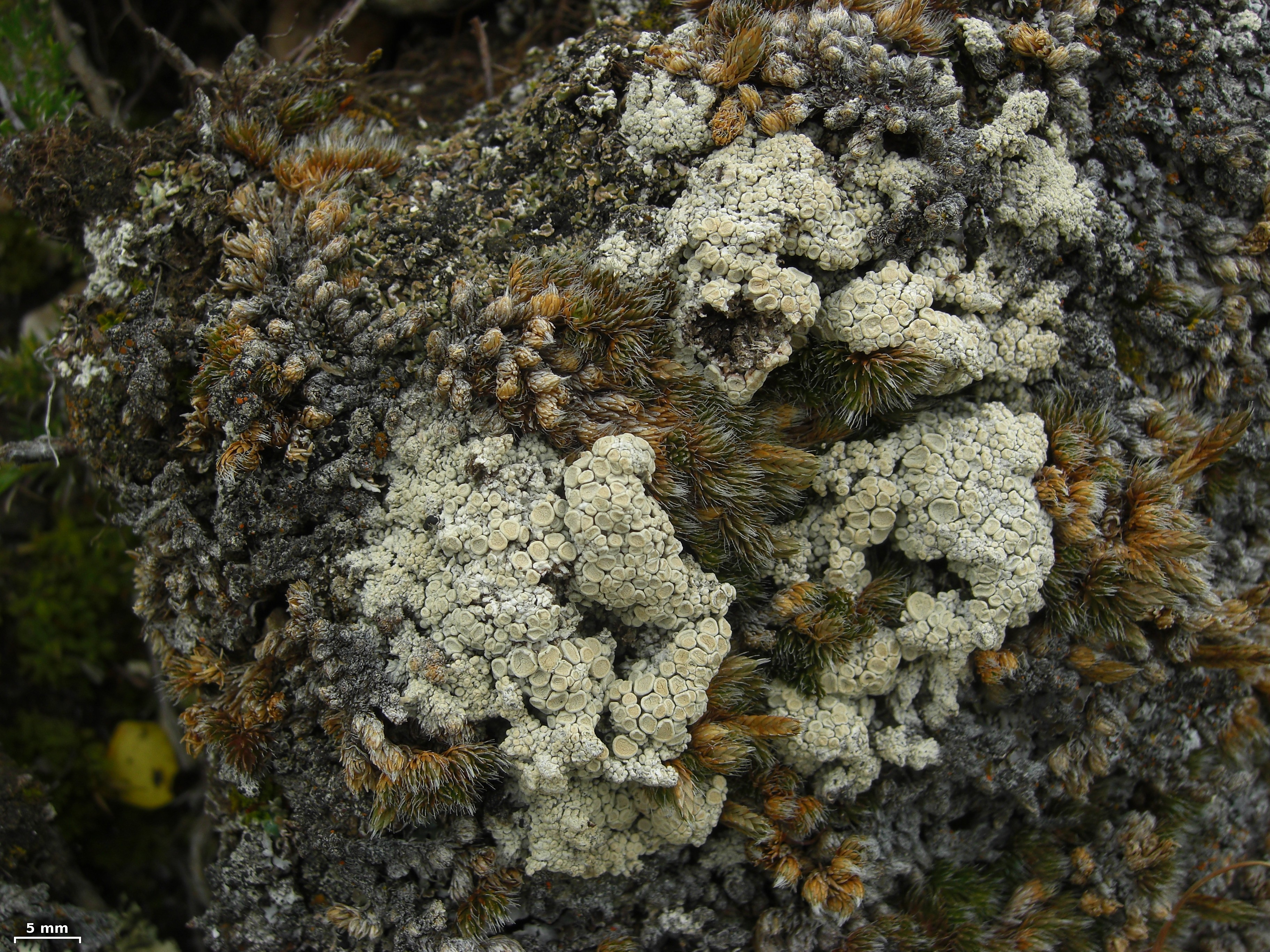

Conservation status
- Apparently Secure (NatureServe)

Scientific classification
- Kingdom: Fungi
- Division: Ascomycota
- Class: Lecanoromycetes
- Order: Pertusariales
- Family: Ochrolechiaceae
- Genus: Ochrolechia
- Species: O. upsaliensis

Binomial name
- Ochrolechia upsaliensis (L.) A.Massal. (1852)

Synonyms
- List: Lichen upsaliensis L. (1753); Lecanora pallescens f. upsaliensis (L.) Anzi (1860); Lecanora pallescens var. upsaliensis (L.) Flot. (1849); Lecanora parella var. upsaliensis (L.) Ach. (1810); Lecanora tartarea var. upsaliensis (L.) Hook. (1833); Lecanora upsaliensis (L.) Röhl. (1813); Lichen parellus var. upsaliensis (L.) Wahlenb. (1812); Ochrolechia pallescens f. upsaliensis (L.) Körb. (1855); Ochrolechia pallescens var. upsaliensis (L.) Rabenh. (1857); Ochrolechia parella var. upsaliensis (L.) Rabenh. (1870); Parmelia pallescens var. upsaliensis (L.) Torss. (1843); Parmelia parella var. upsaliensis (L.) Ach. (1803); Patellaria upsaliensis (L.) Hoffm. (1790); Psora upsaliensis (L.) Hoffm. (1796)

= Ochrolechia upsaliensis =

Species of lichen-forming fungus

Ochrolechia upsaliensis is a species of crustose lichen in the family Ochrolechiaceae. Found in the Northern Hemisphere, it is commonly known as the tundra saucer lichen.

== Taxonomy ==
The lichen was formally described as a new species by Carl Linnaeus in his 1753 work Species Plantarum. He placed it in the eponymous genus Lichen, as he did with all of the 80-odd lichens he described in this work. Abramo Bartolommeo Massalongo transferred the taxon to the genus Ochrolechia in 1852.

== Description ==
The thallus of Ochrolechia upsaliensis is white to grayish-white, and crustose; the thallus thickens with age. The texture of the thallus surface ranges from smooth to granular. The lichen produces abundant apothecia; these reproductive structures are shallowly saucer-shaped, measuring 0.5–3 mm in diameter, with a pale-buff disc. The ascospores typically number 8 per ascus; they are ellipsoid with dimensions of 31–69 by 23–37 μm.

Ochrolechia upsaliensis reacts negatively to all standard lichen spot tests.

== Habitat and distribution ==
Ochrolechia upsaliensis has a Northern Hemisphere distribution, having been reported from Europe, arctic areas of Alaska and Canada, Greenland, and mountainous areas of the United States. It also occurs in mountainous areas of Europe. There, it prefers habitats with calciferous soil and plant debris, and grows optimally above the treeline. In the Alps, where it is widespread, Ochrolechia upsaliensis reaches the Nival zone. It typically overgrows mosses, sedges, grasses, or grows on the ground; less frequently, it has been recorded growing on rock. In Greenland, it is a component of the lichen-rich biological soil crust.

The species is host to the lichenicolous fungus species Sclerococcum deminutum.

== See also ==
- List of lichens named by Carl Linnaeus
