= Ochrolechia insularis =

Scientific classification
- Kingdom: Fungi
- Division: Ascomycota
- Class: Lecanoromycetes
- Order: Pertusariales
- Family: Ochrolechiaceae
- Genus: Ochrolechia
- Species: O. insularis

Binomial name
- Ochrolechia insularis Kantvilas & Elix (2011)

Species of lichen

Ochrolechia insularis is a rare species of crustose lichen in the family Ochrolechiaceae. Found only on Kangaroo Island in South Australia, it forms an intricate crust on granite rocks near the sea, providing a habitat for a diverse range of species.

== Taxonomy ==
Ochrolechia insularis, formally described by Gintaras Kantvilas and John Elix, is a seemingly rare species of lichen with no known apothecia. The species was first discovered on Kangaroo Island in South Australia, at Cape Willoughby, in September 2009. The specific epithet insularis refers to the species' habitat on Kangaroo Island, which is located off the southern coast of mainland Australia.

== Description ==
The Ochrolechia insularis lichen forms an irregular crust, varying in thickness from 0.3 to 4.5 mm, with a smooth, glossy, and white upper surface. Its appearance is characterised by intense papillae, nodules, or plicae. Its cortex, comprising irregularly orientated, branched and anastomosing, short-celled hyphae, is 15–30 μm thick. The photobiont cells, concentrated in a subcortical layer, are spherical, with diameters ranging from 6 to 15 μm.

The lichen's secondary chemistry includes gyrophoric acid, lecanoric acid, and 2'-O-methyllecanoric acid, with reactions including K−, KC+ red, C+ red, P−, and UV− for both cortex and medulla. Ochrolechia insularis is morphologically similar to O. tartarea, a saxicolous (rock-dwelling) species, but differs in its smooth, glossy upper surface and lack of a prothallus.

== Habitat and distribution ==
Ochrolechia insularis is known to occur only at the type locality on Kangaroo Island, where it grows on large, sunny, windswept granite boulders overlooking the sea, but well above the normal level of sea spray. The lichen forms part of the typical community that dominates coastal granite rocks in Southern Australia, which includes species of Rinodina, Tylothallia, Xanthoria, Buellia, Caloplaca, and Xanthoparmelia.

Despite searches in similar habitats both near the type locality and further afield, such as on Flinders Island in Bass Strait, no additional occurrences of Ochrolechia insularis have been found, suggesting that this species is extremely rare and localised.

== Conservation concerns ==
Ochrolechia insularis is a species of high conservation value due to its extremely uncommon and localised nature. The primary site where it grows is heavily degraded by the impact of sheep grazing and other disturbances, raising concerns about the future of this lichen.
