= Ochrolechia gowardii =

Scientific classification
- Domain: Eukaryota
- Kingdom: Fungi
- Division: Ascomycota
- Class: Lecanoromycetes
- Order: Pertusariales
- Family: Ochrolechiaceae
- Genus: Ochrolechia
- Species: O. gowardii

Binomial name
- Ochrolechia gowardii Brodo (1991)

Species of lichen

Ochrolechia gowardii is a species of corticolous (bark-dwelling), crustose lichen in the family Ochrolechiaceae. First described in 1991 by the Canadian lichenologist Irwin M. Brodo, this lichen is characterised by its very thin, yellowish-white body (thallus) that partially embeds into tree bark. O. gowardii has small, powdery structures (soralia) that produce asexual reproductive granules, and its disc-like fruiting bodies (apothecia) with pale yellow-orange to light orange centres. O. gowardii can be found in parts of northwestern North America and Scandinavia, typically growing on subalpine fir or Norway spruce trees.

== Taxonomy ==
The species was formally described as new to science in 1991 by the lichenologist Irwin M. Brodo, as part of a study on the bark-dwelling (corticolous) Ochrolechia species of northern North America. The holotype was collected in Wells Gray Provincial Park in British Columbia, Canada, where it was found growing on Rocky Mountain fir (Abies lasiocarpa). The species epithet honours Trevor Goward, a Canadian lichenologist who collected the type specimen in 1980.

Ochrolechia gowardii is a member of the species complex around Ochrolechia parella, a group of similar species with a yellowish-white thallus.

== Description ==
The thallus, or body, of Ochrolechia gowardii is very thin and membranous, with a yellowish-white colour. It is partially embedded in the bark (endophloedal) and features scattered, irregularly shaped soralia—structures that produce powdery asexual reproductive granules (soredia). These soralia break through the thallus, creating ragged margins, and measure between 0.5 and 1.0 mm in diameter. The soredia themselves are coarsely granular and yellowish-white in colour. Unlike some other lichens, O. gowardii has a distinct margin but lacks a prothallus, a preliminary growth feature that some lichens exhibit.

The apothecia (fruiting bodies) of O. gowardii are commonly present and are sessile, meaning they sit directly on the thallus without a stalk. They are small, ranging from 0.6 to 1.0 mm in diameter, but can occasionally reach up to 1.5 mm. The discs of the apothecia are pale yellow-orange to yellowish-pink or light orange and are usually coated with a coarse, powdery substance (pruina), especially when young. The margins of the apothecia are smooth and even, and they remain level with the disc in mature specimens.

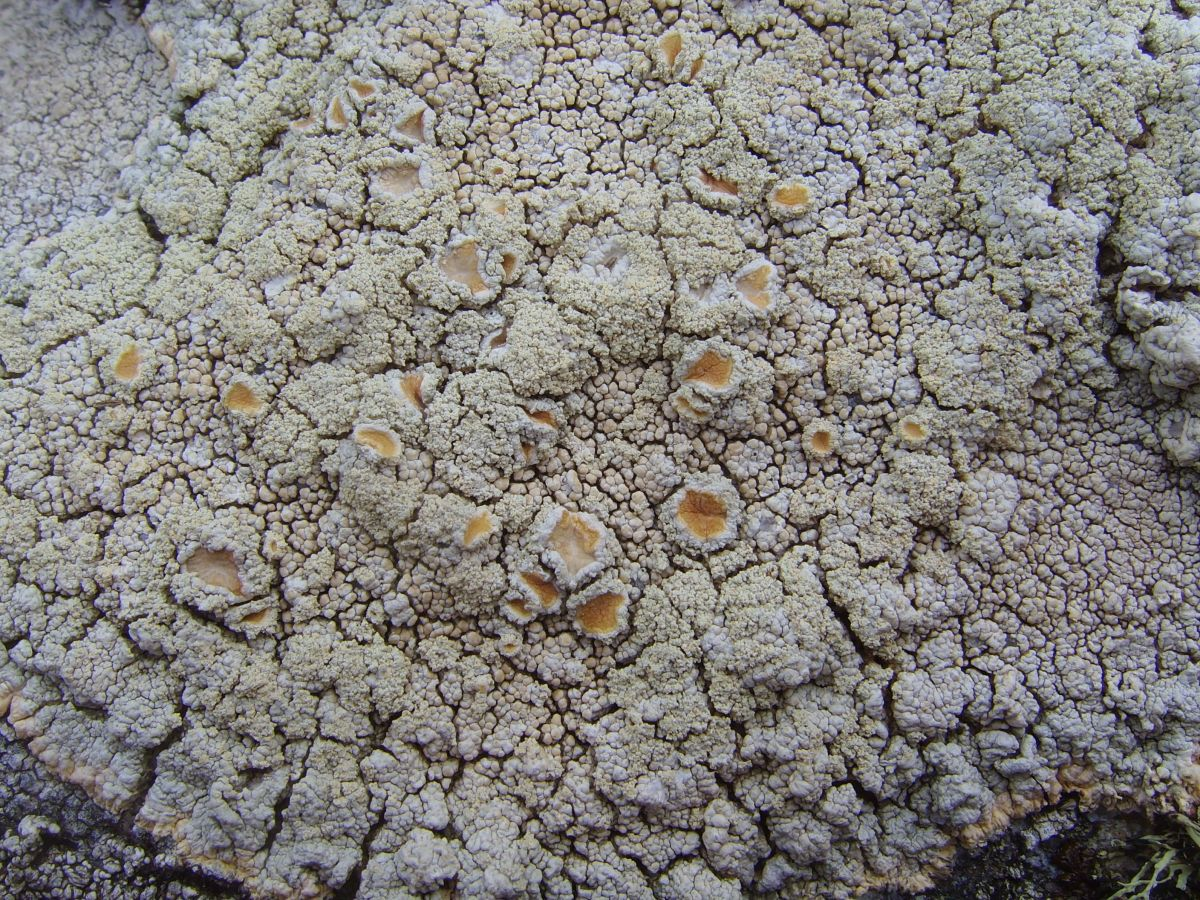
The pictured Ochrolechia androgyna, common in Europe, is a possible lookalike.

The internal structure of the apothecia reveals a hymenium (the spore-producing layer) that is 230–250 μm tall. The hypothecium, a thin layer beneath the hymenium, is about 10 μm thick, while the subhymenium, located just above the hypothecium, is loose and sparse, measuring around 25 μm thick. The excipulum proprium, a thin layer surrounding the hymenium, extends to the surface of the disc and is about 10 μm thick. The amphithecium, a layer surrounding the entire apothecium, is also thin and filled with small, angular crystals, especially at its base. The cortex, or outer layer, is uniform, thin, and non-gelatinous, with a thickness of about 25 μm. The algal layer is mainly concentrated at the lateral margins and features clumps of algae beneath the hypothecium. The ascospores, which are the sexual reproductive spores, are relatively large, measuring 45–65 μm by 22–33 μm, and are consistently found in groups of four per ascus.

Ochrolechia gowardii is distinguished from similar species, such as O. trochophora, by its unique chemical reactions and thin, membranous thallus. The species is also notable for the presence of C+ (red) soredia, a characteristic not found in any other Ochrolechia species. The similarity of its habitat with that of the rare lichen Toensbergia leucococca suggests a shared ecological niche. A possible lookalike in Europe is Ochrolechia androgyna, which usually has a thicker thallus and more delimited soralia. Additionally, this species has eight spores per ascus compared to four in O. gowardii.

== Chemistry ==
The thallus of Ochrolechia gowardii does not react to common lichen spot tests (C−, KC−, K−, PD−), but the soralia react positively to C+ (red) and KC+ (red) tests, indicating the presence of gyrophoric and lecanoric acids. The apothecial margin, cortex, and medulla do not show reactions to these tests, but the apothecial disc does react positively to C+ (red), KC+ (red), and KOH+ (yellow) tests. The apothecia also contain variolaric acid, which is a distinguishing chemical characteristic of this species.

== Habitat and distribution ==
This lichen is typically found in subalpine forests, growing on the bark of Abies lasiocarpa (subalpine fir) at elevations between 1,300 and 1,650 m (4,270 and 5,410 ft). Ochrolechia gowardii has been recorded in several locations within the northern Rocky Mountains, including British Columbia and Alberta in Canada, and parts of Idaho and Montana in the United States. The known northernly extent of its North American distribution was extended when it was reported from Alaska. It has also been recorded in Sør-Trøndelag and Nordland in Norway, Central Norway, and in the province of Jämtland in Sweden; in both countries the lichen was found growing on Picea abies.
