= Leptocyrtinus =

Scientific classification
- Kingdom: Animalia
- Phylum: Arthropoda
- Class: Insecta
- Order: Coleoptera
- Suborder: Polyphaga
- Infraorder: Cucujiformia
- Family: Cerambycidae
- Subfamily: Lamiinae
- Tribe: Cyrtinini
- Genus: Leptocyrtinus; Aurivillius, 1928

Genus of beetles

Leptocyrtinus is a genus of longhorn beetles of the subfamily Lamiinae, containing the following species:

- Leptocyrtinus albosetosus Breuning, 1943
- Leptocyrtinus hebridarum Breuning, 1943
- Leptocyrtinus nitidus (Aurivillius, 1926)
- Leptocyrtinus similis Breuning, 1948
- Leptocyrtinus uniformis Breuning, 1943
