= Decarthria albofasciata =

Scientific classification
- Domain: Eukaryota
- Kingdom: Animalia
- Phylum: Arthropoda
- Class: Insecta
- Order: Coleoptera
- Suborder: Polyphaga
- Infraorder: Cucujiformia
- Family: Cerambycidae
- Genus: Decarthria
- Species: D. albofasciata

Binomial name
- Decarthria albofasciata Gahan, 1895

Species of beetle

Decarthria albofasciata is a species of beetle in the family Cerambycidae. It was described by Gahan in 1895. It is known from Grenada.
