= Scopadus ciliatus =

Scientific classification
- Kingdom: Animalia
- Phylum: Arthropoda
- Clade: Pancrustacea
- Class: Insecta
- Order: Coleoptera
- Suborder: Polyphaga
- Infraorder: Cucujiformia
- Family: Cerambycidae
- Genus: Scopadus
- Species: S. ciliatus

Binomial name
- Scopadus ciliatus Pascoe, 1857

Genus of beetles

Scopadus ciliatus is a species of beetle in the family Cerambycidae. It is known from Brazil, Peru, Bolivia, French Guiana, and Ecuador.

Scopadus ciliatus measure 4.8–10.6 mm (0.19–0.42 in).
