= Decarthria =

Scientific classification
- Domain: Eukaryota
- Kingdom: Animalia
- Phylum: Arthropoda
- Class: Insecta
- Order: Coleoptera
- Suborder: Polyphaga
- Infraorder: Cucujiformia
- Family: Cerambycidae
- Tribe: Cyrtinini
- Genus: Decarthria

Genus of beetles

Decarthria is a genus of longhorn beetles of the subfamily Lamiinae, containing the following species:

- Decarthria albofasciata Gahan, 1895
- Decarthria boricua Micheli, 2003
- Decarthria stephensii Hope, 1834
