= Odontorhabdus rechingeri =

Scientific classification
- Kingdom: Animalia
- Phylum: Arthropoda
- Class: Insecta
- Order: Coleoptera
- Suborder: Polyphaga
- Infraorder: Cucujiformia
- Family: Cerambycidae
- Genus: Odontorhabdus
- Species: O. rechingeri

Binomial name
- Odontorhabdus rechingeri Aurivillius, 1913

Species of beetle

Odontorhabdus rechingeri is a species of beetle in the family Cerambycidae. It was described by Per Olof Christopher Aurivillius in 1913 and is known from Samoa.
