= Leptocyrtinus similis =

Scientific classification
- Kingdom: Animalia
- Phylum: Arthropoda
- Class: Insecta
- Order: Coleoptera
- Suborder: Polyphaga
- Infraorder: Cucujiformia
- Family: Cerambycidae
- Genus: Leptocyrtinus
- Species: L. similis

Binomial name
- Leptocyrtinus similis Breuning, 1948

Species of beetle

Leptocyrtinus similis is a species of beetle in the family Cerambycidae. It was described by Stephan von Breuning in 1948. It is known from Vanuatu.
