= Oloessa poeta =

Scientific classification
- Kingdom: Animalia
- Phylum: Arthropoda
- Class: Insecta
- Order: Coleoptera
- Suborder: Polyphaga
- Infraorder: Cucujiformia
- Family: Cerambycidae
- Genus: Oloessa
- Species: O. poeta

Binomial name
- Oloessa poeta Dillon & Dillon, 1952

Species of beetle

Oloessa poeta is a species of beetle in the family Cerambycidae. It was described by Dillon and Dillon in 1952. It is known from Fiji.
