= Gracilosphya =

Scientific classification
- Kingdom: Animalia
- Phylum: Arthropoda
- Class: Insecta
- Order: Coleoptera
- Suborder: Polyphaga
- Infraorder: Cucujiformia
- Family: Cerambycidae
- Tribe: Cyrtinini
- Genus: Gracilosphya

Genus of beetles

Gracilosphya is a genus of longhorn beetles of the subfamily Lamiinae, containing the following species:

- Gracilosphya elongata (Breuning, 1948)
- Gracilosphya hirtipennis Dillon & Dillon, 1952
- Gracilosphya trifasciata Dillon & Dillon, 1952
