= Cyrtillus =

Scientific classification
- Kingdom: Animalia
- Phylum: Arthropoda
- Class: Insecta
- Order: Coleoptera
- Suborder: Polyphaga
- Infraorder: Cucujiformia
- Family: Cerambycidae
- Tribe: Cyrtinini
- Genus: Cyrtillus; Aurivillius, 1917
- Species: C. albofasciatus

Binomial name
- Cyrtillus albofasciatus Aurivillius, 1917

Genus of beetles

Cyrtillus is a monotypic genus in the family Cerambycidae described by Per Olof Christopher Aurivillius in 1917. Its single species, Cyrtillus albofasciatus, was described by the same author in the same year.
