= Ochrolechia cooperi =

Scientific classification
- Domain: Eukaryota
- Kingdom: Fungi
- Division: Ascomycota
- Class: Lecanoromycetes
- Order: Pertusariales
- Family: Ochrolechiaceae
- Genus: Ochrolechia
- Species: O. cooperi

Binomial name
- Ochrolechia cooperi T.Sprib. (2020)

Species of lichen

Ochrolechia cooperi is a species of crustose lichen in the family Ochrolechiaceae. The lichen forms a creamy white crust with small coral-shaped outgrowths that help it reproduce without producing spores. It was discovered in 2020 in Alaska's Glacier Bay National Park and Preserve and is named after ecologist William Skinner Cooper, who helped establish the park. The species grows on the bark and wood of conifer trees in persistently damp, shaded areas of coastal Alaska's wet forests and muskegs.

== Taxonomy ==
The lichen was formally described as a new species in 2020 by lichenologist Toby Spribille. The type specimen was collected in the Hoonah–Angoon Census Area of Glacier Bay National Park and Preserve, northeast of Gustavus. Here the lichen was found in muskeg growing on a conifer log that still had its bark. The specific epithet honors the American ecologist William Skinner Cooper, "whose studies on plant succession in Glacier Bay and subsequent political lobbying efforts were influential in the establishment of Glacier Bay as a National Monument in 1925".

== Description ==
Ochrolechia cooperi forms a crust-like thallus that sits tightly on its substrate and breaks into a fine network of cracks (rimose). A patch rarely exceeds 5–7 cm across but can be up to 1.2 mm thick. The surface is a creamy white, though it is speckled with scattered coral-shaped isidia—tiny, finger-like outgrowths 0.1–0.5 mm wide that begin as pinkish-tan warts and branch upward. Some specimens bear isidia across most of the thallus, while others have broad isidia-free areas. No dark border (prothallus) is visible at the margin. The lichen's photosynthetic partner is a green alga with nearly spherical cells 10–15 μm in diameter, each surrounded by a clear wall about 1 μm thick.

Rounded fruiting bodies (apothecia) 0.8–2.4 mm wide have been found on only one studied specimen. They sit flush with the surface and eventually hollow out, suggesting that spore production may often abort. The outer rim derived from the thallus is thick and whitish, while the inner fungal rim measures about 50 μm across. In section, the outer wall (amphithecium) is about 190 μm thick at the sides and 310 μm at the base, with the algae appearing in small isolated patches. The spore-forming layer (hymenium) can reach 200 μm tall; it is colorless but turns hazy aqua blue in iodine and is sprinkled with crystals that dissolve to pale yellow in potassium hydroxide (KOH) solution. Supporting filaments (paraphyses) are slender—only 1.8 μm thick in mid-section—and loosen in KOH. The basal tissue (hypothecium) is a faint cream and up to 90 μm thick. Club-shaped asci measure about 155 × 58 μm and swell dramatically in KOH, but mature spores have not yet been observed, and no asexual structures are known.

Chemical spot tests help confirm the species: the thallus and the outer layers of the apothecium turn bright red in a bleach test (C+), while reactions with potassium hydroxide (K−) and paraphenylenediamine (PD−) are negative. Thin-layer chromatography detects gyrophoric acid and, sporadically, a little lecanoric acid.

== Habitat and distribution ==
Ochrolechia cooperi has so far been found only in the coastal lowlands of southeastern and south-central Alaska. Verified collections come from Glacier Bay National Park (Falls Creek, Dundas Bay, Excursion Ridge, and the Gustavus area), Frederick Sound on the north shore of Mitkof Island, Chugach National Forest, and Kenai Fjords National Park, where several sites cluster around Three Hole Bay on the Aialik Peninsula. All records lie between sea level and roughly 250 m elevation.

The lichen colonizes intact bark or decorticated wood of living or fallen conifers—chiefly Sitka spruce (Picea sitchensis) and mountain hemlock (Tsuga mertensiana)—in humid muskeg "tree islands", pond margins, and other wet forest settings. It favors shaded, persistently damp microsites where the substrate retains moisture year-round, such as moss-covered logs and lower trunk bases.
