= Leptocyrtinus nitidus =

Scientific classification
- Kingdom: Animalia
- Phylum: Arthropoda
- Class: Insecta
- Order: Coleoptera
- Suborder: Polyphaga
- Infraorder: Cucujiformia
- Family: Cerambycidae
- Genus: Leptocyrtinus
- Species: L. nitidus

Binomial name
- Leptocyrtinus nitidus (Aurivillius, 1926)

Species of beetle

Leptocyrtinus nitidus is a species of beetle in the family Cerambycidae. It was described by Per Olof Christopher Aurivillius in 1926 and is known from Samoa.
