= Odontorhabdus dentipes =

Scientific classification
- Kingdom: Animalia
- Phylum: Arthropoda
- Class: Insecta
- Order: Coleoptera
- Suborder: Polyphaga
- Infraorder: Cucujiformia
- Family: Cerambycidae
- Genus: Odontorhabdus
- Species: O. dentipes

Binomial name
- Odontorhabdus dentipes Aurivillius, 1928

Species of beetle

Odontorhabdus dentipes is a species of beetle in the family Cerambycidae. It was described by Per Olof Christopher Aurivillius in 1928 and is known from Samoa.
