= Decarthria boricua =

Scientific classification
- Domain: Eukaryota
- Kingdom: Animalia
- Phylum: Arthropoda
- Class: Insecta
- Order: Coleoptera
- Suborder: Polyphaga
- Infraorder: Cucujiformia
- Family: Cerambycidae
- Genus: Decarthria
- Species: D. boricua

Binomial name
- Decarthria boricua Micheli, 2003

Species of beetle

Decarthria boricua is a species of beetle in the family Cerambycidae. It was discovered by entomologist Julio Micheli in 2003. It is endemic to Puerto Rico.
