= Scopadus =

Scientific classification
- Kingdom: Animalia
- Phylum: Arthropoda
- Clade: Pancrustacea
- Class: Insecta
- Order: Coleoptera
- Suborder: Polyphaga
- Infraorder: Cucujiformia
- Family: Cerambycidae
- Tribe: Cyrtinini
- Genus: Scopadus; Pascoe, 1857

Genus of beetles

Scopadus is a genus of beetles in the family Cerambycidae. They occur in the northern half of South America and in Panama.

== Species ==
There are three recognized species:

- Scopadus charynae Santos-Silva & Nascimento, 2019
- Scopadus ciliatus Pascoe, 1857
- Scopadus selkingi Heffern, Santos-Silva & Nascimento, 2021
