= Diastophya fuscicollis =

Scientific classification
- Kingdom: Animalia
- Phylum: Arthropoda
- Class: Insecta
- Order: Coleoptera
- Suborder: Polyphaga
- Infraorder: Cucujiformia
- Family: Cerambycidae
- Genus: Diastophya
- Species: D. fuscicollis

Binomial name
- Diastophya fuscicollis Aurivillius, 1920

Synonyms
- Leptocyrtinus cuprea Breuning, 1948

Species of beetle

Diastophya fuscicollis is a species of beetle in the family Cerambycidae. It was described by Per Olof Christopher Aurivillius in 1920.
