= Oloessa =

Scientific classification
- Kingdom: Animalia
- Phylum: Arthropoda
- Class: Insecta
- Order: Coleoptera
- Suborder: Polyphaga
- Infraorder: Cucujiformia
- Family: Cerambycidae
- Subfamily: Lamiinae
- Tribe: Cyrtinini
- Genus: Oloessa; Pascoe, 1864

Genus of beetles

Oloessa is a genus of longhorn beetles of the subfamily Lamiinae, containing the following species:

- Oloessa bianor Dillon & Dillon, 1952
- Oloessa cenea Dillon & Dillon, 1952
- Oloessa minuta Pascoe, 1864
- Oloessa poeta Dillon & Dillon, 1952
