= Leptocyrtinus hebridarum =

Scientific classification
- Kingdom: Animalia
- Phylum: Arthropoda
- Class: Insecta
- Order: Coleoptera
- Suborder: Polyphaga
- Infraorder: Cucujiformia
- Family: Cerambycidae
- Genus: Leptocyrtinus
- Species: L. hebridarum

Binomial name
- Leptocyrtinus hebridarum Breuning, 1943

Species of beetle

Leptocyrtinus hebridarum is a species of beetle in the family Cerambycidae. It was described by Stephan von Breuning in 1943. It is known from Vanuatu.
