= Gracilosphya elongata =

Scientific classification
- Kingdom: Animalia
- Phylum: Arthropoda
- Class: Insecta
- Order: Coleoptera
- Suborder: Polyphaga
- Infraorder: Cucujiformia
- Family: Cerambycidae
- Genus: Gracilosphya
- Species: G. elongata

Binomial name
- Gracilosphya elongata (Breuning, 1948)

Synonyms
- Leptocyrtinus elongatus Breuning, 1948

Species of beetle

Gracilosphya elongata is a species of beetle in the family Cerambycidae. It was described by Stephan von Breuning in 1948.

== Subspecies ==
- Gracilosphya elongata elongata (Breuning, 1948)
- Gracilosphya elongata immaculata Dillon & Dillon, 1952
- Gracilosphya elongata suturalis Dillon & Dillon, 1952
