= Odontorhabdus teretiscapus =

Scientific classification
- Kingdom: Animalia
- Phylum: Arthropoda
- Class: Insecta
- Order: Coleoptera
- Suborder: Polyphaga
- Infraorder: Cucujiformia
- Family: Cerambycidae
- Genus: Odontorhabdus
- Species: O. teretiscapus

Binomial name
- Odontorhabdus teretiscapus Aurivillius, 1928

Species of beetle

Odontorhabdus teretiscapus is a species of beetle in the family Cerambycidae. It was described by Per Olof Christopher Aurivillius in 1928 and is known from Samoa.
