= Brachyrhabdus =

Scientific classification
- Domain: Eukaryota
- Kingdom: Animalia
- Phylum: Arthropoda
- Class: Insecta
- Order: Coleoptera
- Suborder: Polyphaga
- Infraorder: Cucujiformia
- Family: Cerambycidae
- Tribe: Cyrtinini
- Genus: Brachyrhabdus; Aurivillius, 1917
- Species: B. bifasciatus

Binomial name
- Brachyrhabdus bifasciatus Aurivillius, 1917

Genus of beetles

Brachyrhabdus is a monotypic beetle genus in the family Cerambycidae described by Per Olof Christopher Aurivillius in 1917. Its only species, Brachyrhabdus bifasciatus, was described by the same author.
