= Haplorhabdus =

Scientific classification
- Kingdom: Animalia
- Phylum: Arthropoda
- Class: Insecta
- Order: Coleoptera
- Suborder: Polyphaga
- Infraorder: Cucujiformia
- Family: Cerambycidae
- Tribe: Cyrtinini
- Genus: Haplorhabdus; Aurivillius, 1917
- Species: H. nymani

Binomial name
- Haplorhabdus nymani Aurivillius, 1917

Genus of beetles

Haplorhabdus is a monotypic beetle genus in the family Cerambycidae described by Per Olof Christopher Aurivillius in 1917. Its only species, Haplorhabdus nymani, was described by the same author in the same year.
