= Diastophya =

Scientific classification
- Kingdom: Animalia
- Phylum: Arthropoda
- Class: Insecta
- Order: Coleoptera
- Suborder: Polyphaga
- Infraorder: Cucujiformia
- Family: Cerambycidae
- Tribe: Cyrtinini
- Genus: Diastophya

Genus of beetles

Diastophya is a genus of longhorn beetles of the subfamily Lamiinae, containing the following species:

- Diastophya agetes Dillon & Dillon, 1952
- Diastophya albisetosa Dillon & Dillon, 1952
- Diastophya bimaculata Dillon & Dillon, 1952
- Diastophya fuscicollis Aurivillius, 1920
