= Sciocyrtinus =

Scientific classification
- Kingdom: Animalia
- Phylum: Arthropoda
- Class: Insecta
- Order: Coleoptera
- Suborder: Polyphaga
- Infraorder: Cucujiformia
- Family: Cerambycidae
- Genus: Sciocyrtinus
- Species: S. elongatus

Binomial name
- Sciocyrtinus elongatus Fisher, 1935

Genus of beetles

Sciocyrtinus elongatus is a species of beetle in the family Cerambycidae, and the only species in the genus Sciocyrtinus. It was described by Fisher in 1935.
