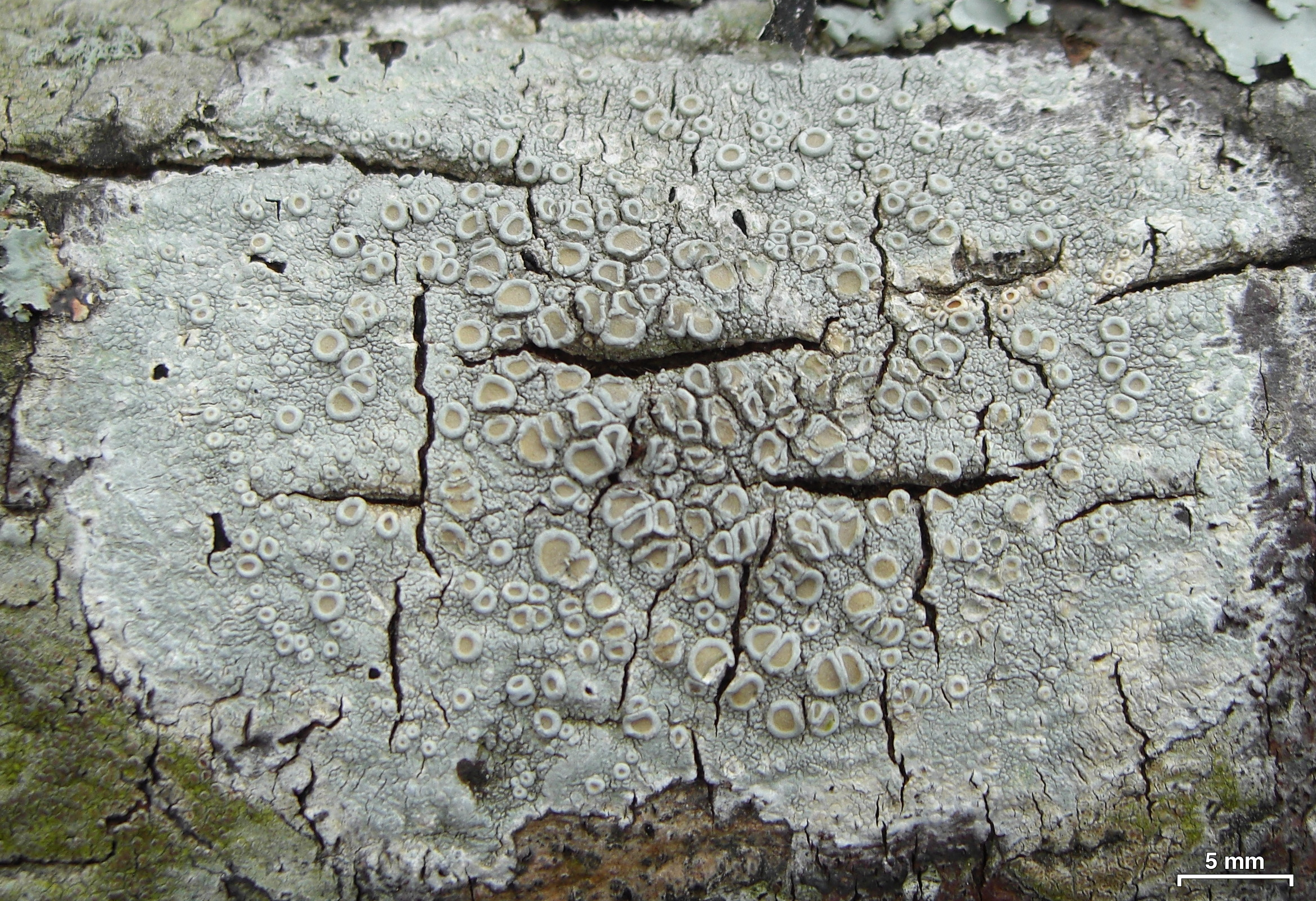
- in Tidewater, Virginia

Conservation status
- Secure (NatureServe)

Scientific classification
- Kingdom: Fungi
- Division: Ascomycota
- Class: Lecanoromycetes
- Order: Pertusariales
- Family: Ochrolechiaceae
- Genus: Ochrolechia
- Species: O. africana

Binomial name
- Ochrolechia africana Vain. (1926)

= Ochrolechia africana =

Species of lichen

Ochrolechia africana, commonly known as the frosty saucer lichen, is a species of crustose and corticolous (bark-dwelling) lichen in the family Ochrolechiaceae. It is a widely distributed species, found in tropical and subtropical areas of southern Africa, Asia, Australia, North America, and South America. The lichen is characterized by the presence of a white "frosty" or powdery apothecia.

== Taxonomy ==
The lichen was scientifically described as a new species in 1926 by Finnish lichenologist Edvard August Vainio. The type specimen was collected by mycologist Paul Andries van der Bijl from South Africa, from "Durban Trunk of tree" in 1921. The specific epithet refers to the type locality. A common name used in North America is "frosty saucer lichen".

== Description ==
Ochrolechia africana has a crustose, yellowish-grey to gray thallus with a surface texture ranging from smooth to warted (verruculose or verrucose). The apothecia tend to be under 1.5 mm (0.1 in) in diameter, and have thick margins; they are often covered with a "frosty"-looking pruina, although there are forms that lack pruina. The algal layer makes an almost complete layer under the hypothecium, forming abundant but discontinuous clumps. The ascospores measure 43–67 by 18–30 μm.

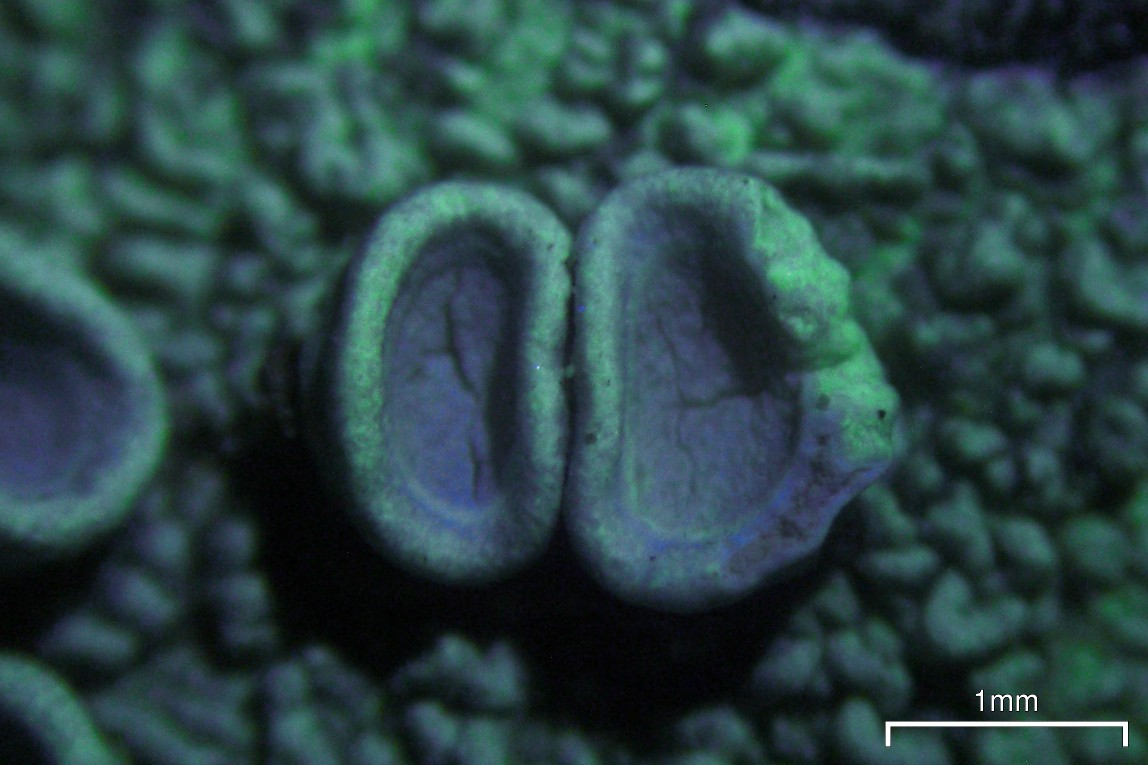
UV-illuminated thallus and apothecia of Ochrolechia africana; the yellowish colour results from the fluorescence of lichexanthone.

Ochrolechia africana contains several secondary chemicals: the orcinol depsides gyrophoric acid, lecanoric acid, 5-methyl-O-methylhiascic acid, 4,5-di-O-methylhiascic acid, and the xanthone lichexanthone. It is this latter compound that causes the lichen to fluoresce bright yellow when shone with a UV light.

The Chinese alpine species Ochrolechia alticola is somewhat similar in appearance to O. africana, but differs in the C+ red reaction of the apothecial margin cortex, the absence of 5-O-methylhiascic acid, as well as its habitat.

== Habitat and distribution ==
Ochrolechia africana is a widely distributed species, found in tropical and subtropical areas of southern Africa, Asia, Australia, North America, and South America. Reported as new to China in 2013, it is one of about 25 Ochrolechia species known to occur in that country. It typically grows on both the wood and bark of deciduous trees, although it has also been recorded growing on rocks.

Irwin Brodo and James Lendemer reported on an atypical population of Ochrolechia africana they found in the Coastal Plain of southeastern North America; these lichens were sorediate and fertile, rather than the typical asorediate and fertile population that was expected.

== Parasites ==
Cornutispora lichenicola is a lichenicolous fungus that has been reported growing on Ochrolechia africana lichens in Bolivia. In North America, the fungus Roselliniopsis tropica has been found on O. africana populations in the southeastern United States; infection by the fungus results in the formation of swollen gall-like structures on the lichen thalli. In the Himachal Pradesh and Karnataka districts of India, a new species of lichenicolous fungus, Lichenodiplis ochrolechiae, was found infesting the thallus and apothecial discs of local O. africana populations.
