= Ochrolechia minuta =

Scientific classification
- Kingdom: Fungi
- Division: Ascomycota
- Class: Lecanoromycetes
- Order: Pertusariales
- Family: Ochrolechiaceae
- Genus: Ochrolechia
- Species: O. minuta

Binomial name
- Ochrolechia minuta (Degel.) T.Sprib. (2020)

Synonyms
- Perforaria minuta Degel. (1938); Coccotrema minutum (Degel.) R.Sant. (2010)

Species of lichen

Ochrolechia minuta is a species of crustose lichen in the family Ochrolechiaceae. It was first formally described in 1938 by Swedish lichenologist Gunnar Degelius as Perforaria minuta. The type specimen was collected from the Kodiak Island Borough in Alaska. Toby Spribille transferred it to the genus Ochrolechia in 2020, suggesting that the absence of cephalodia, and the presence of alectoronic acid, indicate that it is "related to the alectoronic acid-containing species of poriform Ochrolechia".
