= Oloessa minuta =

Scientific classification
- Kingdom: Animalia
- Phylum: Arthropoda
- Class: Insecta
- Order: Coleoptera
- Suborder: Polyphaga
- Infraorder: Cucujiformia
- Family: Cerambycidae
- Genus: Oloessa
- Species: O. minuta

Binomial name
- Oloessa minuta Pascoe, 1864

Species of beetle

Oloessa minuta is a species of beetle in the family Cerambycidae. It was described by Pascoe in 1864. It is known from Moluccas.
