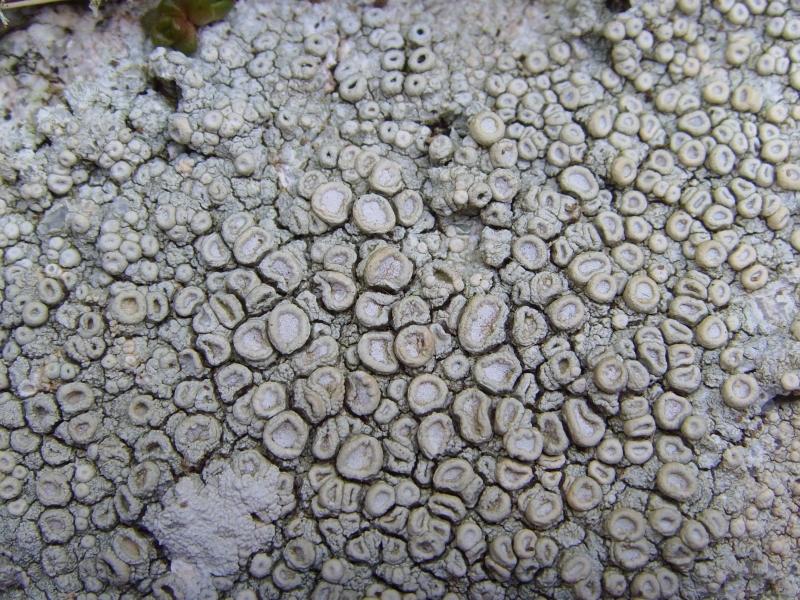
- Ochrolechia parella

Scientific classification
- Kingdom: Fungi
- Division: Ascomycota
- Class: Lecanoromycetes
- Order: Pertusariales
- Family: Ochrolechiaceae; R.C.Harris ex Lumbsch & I.Schmitt (2006)
- Genus: Ochrolechia; A.Massal. (1852)

Type species
- Ochrolechia tartarea (L.) Zahlbr. (1852)

Synonyms
- Korkir Adans. (1763)

= Ochrolechia =

Genus of lichen-forming fungi

Ochrolechia is the sole genus in the fungal family Ochrolechiaceae. It comprises about 40 species of crustose lichens. These lichens typically form uneven, often thick, crust-like growths on various surfaces and are characterised by their white to pale grey thalli, which may have a greenish tint. The genus has a long evolutionary history, with fossils dating back to the Paleogene period, about 34 million years ago. Ochrolechia species have disc-like apothecia (fruiting bodies), which are usually yellowish or brownish-pink and often covered with a fine white powdery coating. The genus is widely distributed and includes both common and rare species, with some found in extreme environments such as arctic and alpine regions. Ochrolechia lichens produce diverse secondary metabolites, including orcinol depsides, depsidones, and xanthones.

== Taxonomy ==
Genus Ochrolechia was proposed by the Italian lichenologist Abramo Bartolommeo Massalongo in 1852. The family Ochrolechiaceae was first proposed by Richard C. Harris in 1990 as an informal designation ("ined."), and was later formally circumscribed by H. Thorsten Lumbsch and Imke Schmitt in 2006. The family was initially conceived to include Ochrolechia and tentatively the Varicellaria and Variolaria groups of species that were formerly classified within the large genus Pertusaria.

The family is characterised by:

- crustose thallus containing green algae
- disc-shaped, zeorine, hemiangiocarpous fruiting bodies
- cup-shaped, hyaline excipulum
- amyloid or non-amyloid hymenium
- branched, septate, anastomosing paraphysoids
- strongly amyloid asci containing 1–8 spores
- hyaline ascospores, either non-septate or with a single septum
- immersed pycnidia

Ochrolechiaceae is now monogeneric, containing only the type genus Ochrolechia. The genus Varicellaria, which was tentatively included when the family was first proposed, has since been elevated to its own family, Varicellariaceae, which was proposed in 2011 and validly published in 2018.

== Fossil history ==
Paleontological studies have revealed that Ochrolechia existed as far back as the Paleogene period, approximately 34 million years ago. This discovery was made through the analysis of well-preserved amber fossils from Europe. These fossils include several Ochrolechia specimens that show morphological similarities to modern species, such as O. subplicans and O. xanthostoma. Two of these ancient Ochrolechia specimens were found hosting lichenicolous fungi of the genus Lichenostigma, indicating a long-standing symbiotic relationship between these fungi and their lichen hosts. The presence of such fossils provides calibration points for understanding the evolutionary timeline of both Ochrolechia and Lichenostigma.

== Description ==
The genus Ochrolechia comprises crustose lichens that typically form uneven, often thick, crust-like growths. The thallus, or body, of these lichens can vary in appearance from smooth and continuous to slightly cracked (rimose). In some cases, the thallus may appear as scattered, convex warts or, more rarely, as minutely shrubby due to the presence of tiny papillae or spine-like extensions. The colour of the thallus ranges from white or pale grey to dark grey, often with a greenish tint. A prothallus, which is a preliminary growth that may be visible around the edges of the thallus, is sometimes present and grey, though it may also be absent.

The upper surface of the thallus generally lacks a distinct protective layer (cortex), or may have a very thin cortex made up of thin-walled fungal filaments (hyphae). The lichen's symbiotic partner, or photobiont, is a chlorococcoid alga, which contributes to the lichen's overall colour and undertakes photosynthesis.

The reproductive structures of Ochrolechia, the apothecia, are disc-like and typically expanded, though in rare cases, they may be pore-like (poriform). The discs are usually yellowish or brownish-pink in colour, often covered with a fine white powdery coating known as pruina. The apothecia are surrounded by a well-developed thalline margin, which is a rim of tissue derived from the thallus itself. In some species, a narrow true exciple, the tissue surrounding the hymenium (spore-producing layer), is visible.

The hymenium in Ochrolechia apothecia is relatively tall, measuring between 150 and 200 μm. The hamathecium, which supports the developing spores, consists of thin, densely branched, and interconnected filaments known as paraphyses. The asci, or spore-producing cells, contain between two and eight spores, and have thick, amyloid walls, meaning they stain blue with iodine and are similar to those found in the genus Pertusaria. The ascospores themselves are relatively large, lack internal divisions (aseptate), have relatively thin walls considering their size, and are smooth in texture.

Ochrolechia also reproduces asexually through pycnidia, which are flask-shaped structures embedded in the thallus. The conidia (asexual spores) produced by the pycnidia are cylindrical to elongated and are straight rather than curved.

Chemically, Ochrolechia species are known to produce orcinol depsides and depsidones, particularly gyrophoric and lecanoric acids, as well as xanthones and fatty acids. These compounds contribute to the lichen's characteristics and can be used in chemical spot tests to help identify the species.

== Species ==
As of August 2024, Species Fungorum (in the Catalogue of Life) accepts 41 species of Ochrolechia.

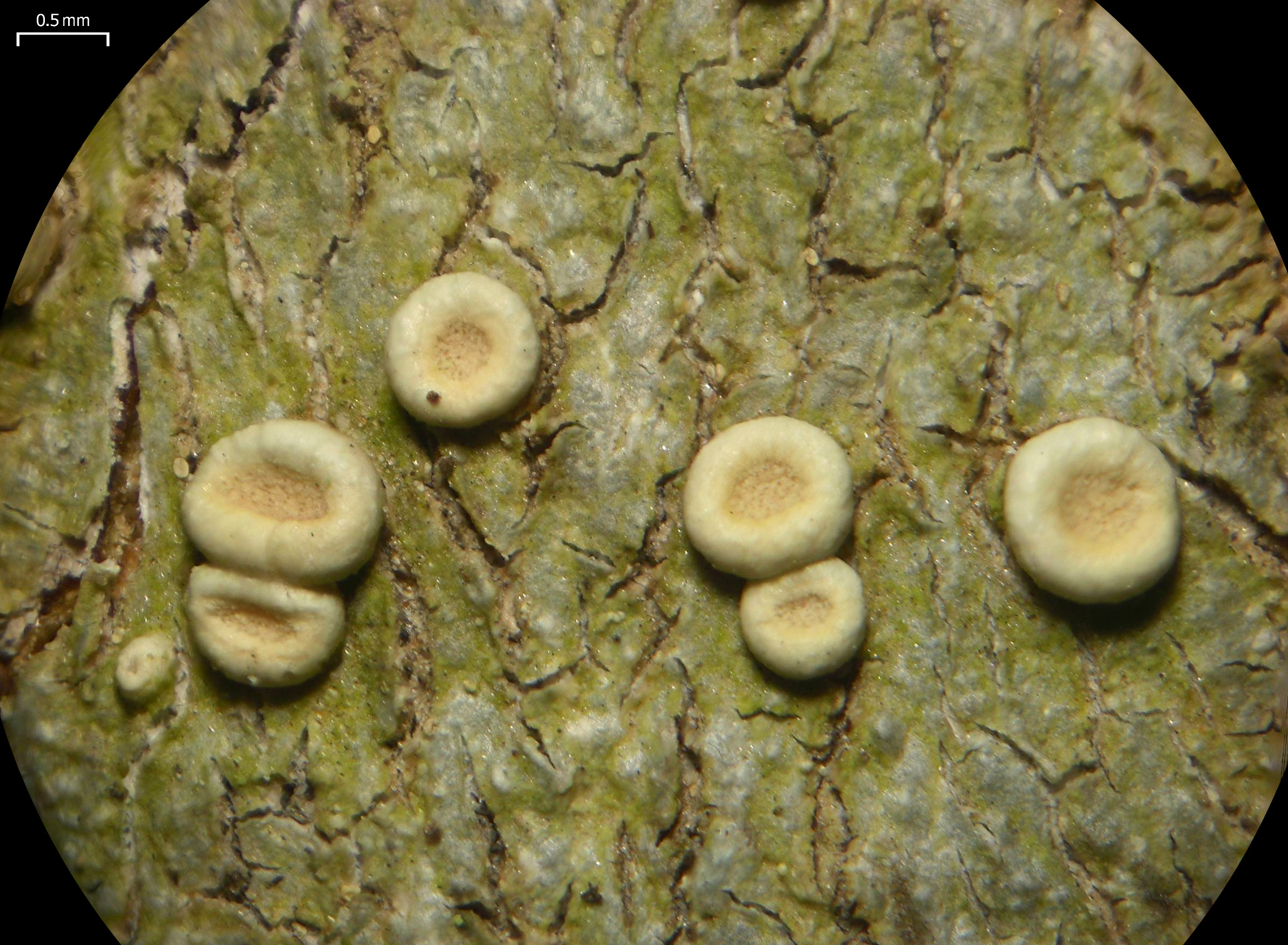
Ochrolechia szatalaensis

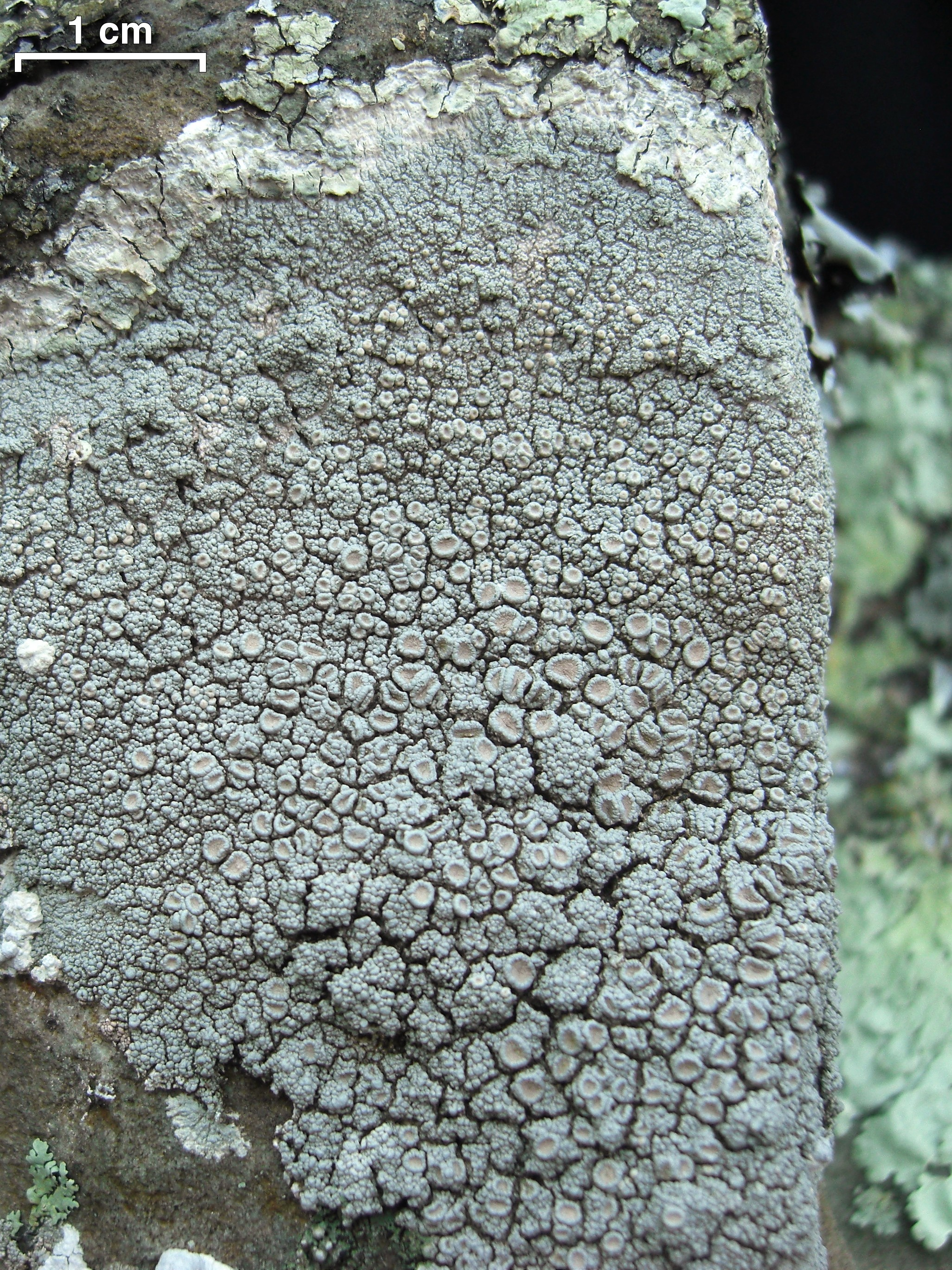
Ochrolechia trochophora

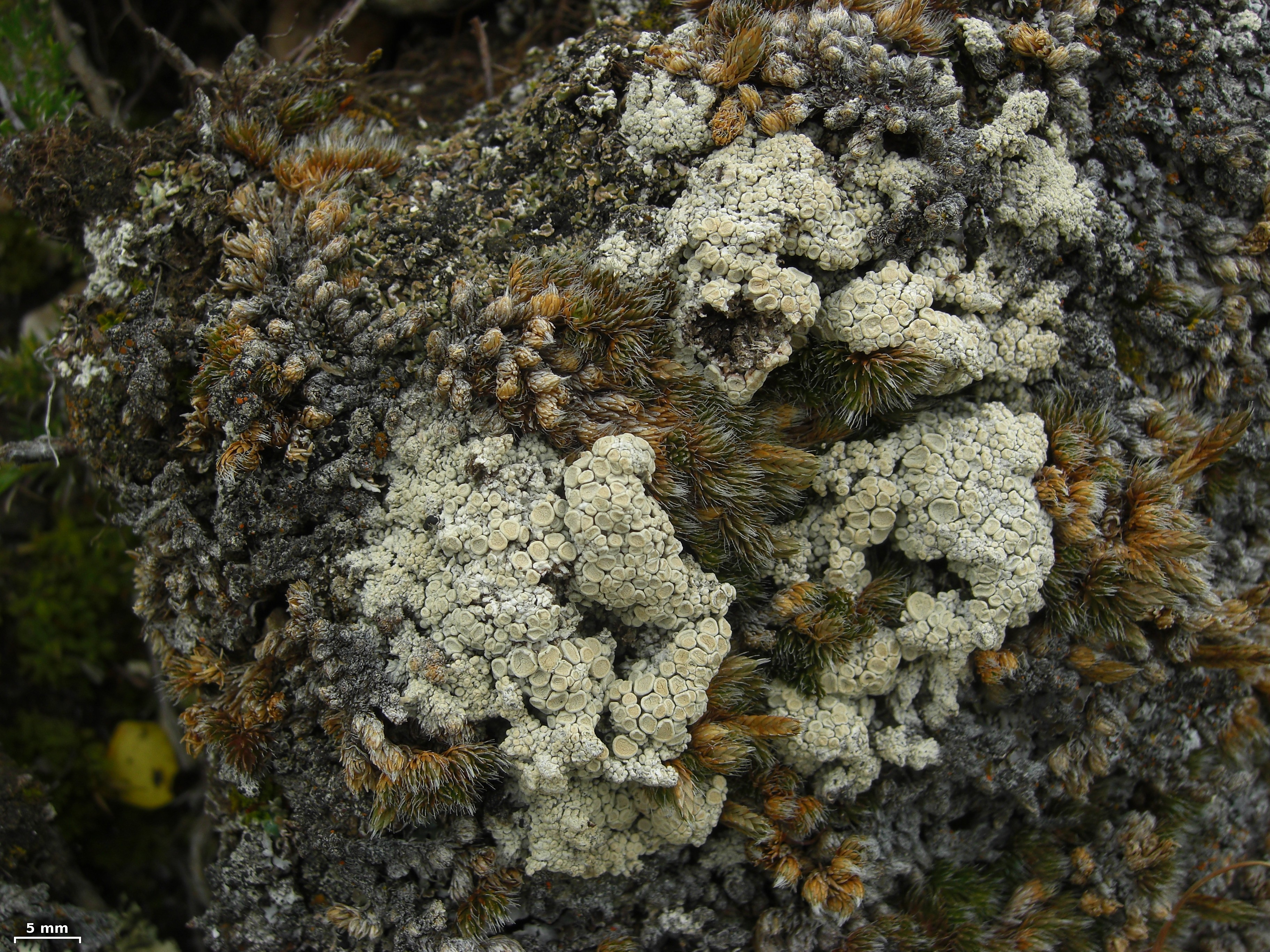
Ochrolechia upsaliensis

- Ochrolechia aegaea Kukwa (2009)
- Ochrolechia africana Vain. (1926)
- Ochrolechia alaskana (Verseghy) Kukwa (2009)
- Ochrolechia alectoronica Imshaug ex Kantvilas & Fryday (2021)
- Ochrolechia alticola Q.Ren (2017)
- Ochrolechia androgyna (Hoffm.) Arnold (1885)
- Ochrolechia antillarum Brodo (1991)
- Ochrolechia arborea (Kreyer) Almb. (1949)
- Ochrolechia brodoi Kukwa (2011)
- Ochrolechia cooperi T.Sprib. (2020)
- Ochrolechia frigida (Sw.) Lynge (1928)
- Ochrolechia gowardii Brodo (1991)
- Ochrolechia gyrophorica (A.W.Archer) A.W.Archer & Lumbsch (1997)
- Ochrolechia inaequatula (Nyl.) Zahlbr. (1913)
- Ochrolechia incarnata (Leight.) Kukwa, I.Schmitt & Ertz (2018)
- Ochrolechia insularis Kantvilas & Elix (2011)
- Ochrolechia inversa (Nyl.) J.R.Laundon (1963)
- Ochrolechia juvenalis Brodo (1991)
- Ochrolechia kerguelensis Ertz & Kukwa (2016)
- Ochrolechia lijiangensis Q.Ren (2017)
- Ochrolechia longispora Brodo & Q.Ren (2017)
- Ochrolechia macrosperma (Müll. Arg.) R.W.Rogers (1982)
- Ochrolechia microstictoides Räsänen (1936)
- Ochrolechia minuta (Degel.) T.Sprib. (2020)
- Ochrolechia montana Brodo (1991)
- Ochrolechia neoisidiata Elix (2007)
- Ochrolechia pallenti-isidiata Z.F.Jia & Q.Ren (2009)
- Ochrolechia pallescens (L.) A.Massal. (1853)
- Ochrolechia parella (L.) A.Massal. (1852)
- Ochrolechia pseudopallescens Brodo (1991)
- Ochrolechia pseudotartarea (Vain.) Verseghy (1962)
- Ochrolechia raynorii E.A.Tripp & J.L.Watts (2025) – Colorado, US
- Ochrolechia rhodoleuca (Th.Fr.) Brodo (1988)
- Ochrolechia rugomarginata Q.Ren (2017)
- Ochrolechia splendens Lumbsch & Messuti (2003)
- Ochrolechia subathallina H.Magn. (1940)
- Ochrolechia subisidiata Brodo (1991)
- Ochrolechia subpallescens Verseghy (1962)
- Ochrolechia subrhodotropa (A.W.Archer) K.Schmitz & Lumbsch (1994)
- Ochrolechia subrosella Z.F.Jia & Z.T.Zhao (2005)
- Ochrolechia subviridis (Høeg) Erichsen (1930)
- Ochrolechia szatalaensis Verseghy (1958)
- Ochrolechia tartarea (L.) A.Massal. (1852)
- Ochrolechia tiroliensis (Erichsen) Hafellner & Türk (2001)
- Ochrolechia trochophora (Vain.) Oshio (1968)
- Ochrolechia turneri (Sm.) Zopf (1896)
- Ochrolechia upsaliensis (L.) A.Massal. (1852)
- Ochrolechia weymouthii Jatta (1911)
- Ochrolechia xanthostoma (Sommerf.) K.Schmitz & Lumbsch (1994)
