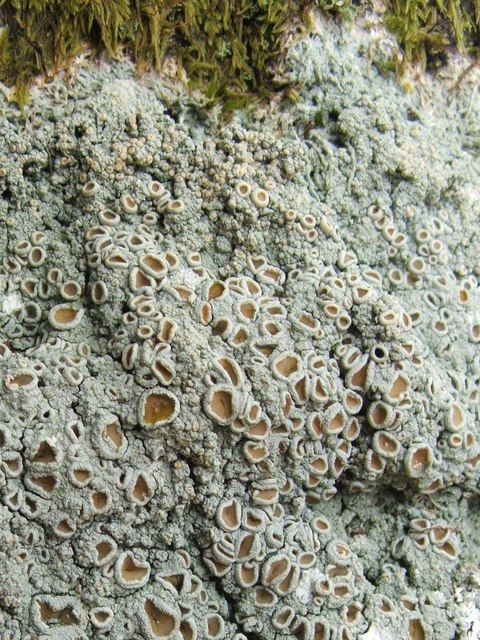

Conservation status
- Apparently Secure (NatureServe)

Scientific classification
- Kingdom: Fungi
- Division: Ascomycota
- Class: Lecanoromycetes
- Order: Pertusariales
- Family: Ochrolechiaceae
- Genus: Ochrolechia
- Species: O. tartarea

Binomial name
- Ochrolechia tartarea (L.) A.Massal. (1852)

Synonyms
- List: Lichen tartareus L. (1753); Verrucaria tartarea (L.) F.H.Wigg. (1780); Scutellaria tartarea (L.) Baumg. (1790); Parmelia tartarea (L.) Ach. (1803); Patellaria tartarea (L.) DC. (1805); Lecanora tartarea (L.) Ach. (1810); Rinodina tartarea (L.) Gray (1821); Parmelia parella var. tartarea (L.) Schaer. (1839); Lecanora pallescens var. tartarea (L.) Branth & Rostr. (1869); Pertusaria tartarea (L.) Müll.Arg. (1879); Lecanora tartarea var. grandinosa Ach. (1810); Rinodina grandinosa (Ach.) Gray (1821); Lecanora tartarea f. grandinosa (Ach.) Leight. (1871); Ochrolechia tartarea var. grandinosa (Ach.) Arnold (1882); Ochrolechia frigida f. grandinosa (Ach.) H.Magn. (1952); Ochrolechia frigida var. grandinosa (Ach.) G.E.Howard (1970); Pertusaria gyrocheila Nyl. (1865); Pertusaria tumidula Erichsen (1934); Ochrolechia erichsenii Hafellner & Türk (2001); Ochrolechia tartarea var. pycnidiifera Verseghy (1958)

= Ochrolechia tartarea =

Species of lichen-forming fungus

Ochrolechia tartarea is a species of saxicolous (rock-dwelling) crustose lichen in the family Ochrolechiaceae. It forms thick, greyish crusts with a rough, crumbly surface marked by irregular warts, typically found on acidic rocks in moist, upland environments across Europe and parts of Asia. The lichen produces distinctive reproductive structures (apothecia) that appear as rounded, pale brown to orange-pink discs up to 5 mm across, often densely packed across its surface. Originally described by Carl Linnaeus in 1753 as Lichen tartareus, it was historically significant as the source of cudbear, a red dye that was commercially important in 18th-century Scotland before overharvesting led to population declines. The species is widespread in the oceanic and mountainous regions of Britain and Ireland, extends through the Alps of central Europe, and has been recorded as far east as South Korea, though it becomes rare in lowland areas and is often confused with similar species.

== Taxonomy ==
Ochrolechia tartarea was first formally described by the Swedish naturalist Carl Linnaeus in his 1753 work Species Plantarum, where he gave it the name Lichen tartareus. Linnaeus characterised the species as a crustose lichen with a whitish to greenish thallus and rounded fruiting bodies (apothecia) that were yellowish at the edge. He distinguished it from related lichens by features such as a pale marginal zone (prothallus) and by comparison with earlier descriptions and figures published by Dillenius and Micheli. At the time, Linnaeus placed it in the broad catch-all genus Lichen, which included nearly all known lichens. After having been transferred to various genera in its taxonomic history, Abramo Bartolommeo Massalongo reclassified it in the genus Ochrolechia in 1852.

More than two centuries of continuous use of this name in dye-making sources prompted researchers to take another look at Linnaeus's original specimens. Per Magnus Jørgensen and his collaborators (1994) discovered that no specimen exists in the Linnaean Herbarium (LINN). The material in the Dillenius herbarium at Oxford linked to the referenced illustration actually represents Lecanora, while the specimen housed in Micheli's herbarium in Florence corresponds to Diploschistes ocellatus. Since these illustrations are part of the original description, the researchers selected the Dillenius plate as the lectotype (the single element chosen from the original materials to serve as the definitive type specimen). To maintain historical nomenclatural stability, they also recommended conserving Lichen tartareus with a different type: a Scottish specimen forwarded to Linnaeus by Burgess in 1771 (LINN 1273.31), complete with documentation of its dyeing properties and almost certainly examined by Linnaeus himself. This specimen exemplifies typical O. tartarea, featuring a robust, non-sorediate, pale-grey thallus and large, eventually flattened, pinkish apothecia, and serves as the type species of Ochrolechia.

Klára Verseghy divided the genus Ochrolechia into four groups based on morphology (tatareae, parellae, harmandii, and upsaliensi). Irwin M. Brodo later renamed these, including group tartarea. Taxa in this group have gyrophoric acid in the cortex, disc presence or absence in the margin, pruina-free apothecia, and rarely have variolaric acid.

== Description ==
Ochrolechia tartarea has a thallus that can grow quite thick (for crustose lichens), up to 3 mm or more. The thallus ranges in colour from pale to dark grey and has a rough, and crumbly surface. Its surface is often uneven, marked by numerous irregular warts forming a corrugated crust. Occasionally, it has a paler zoned margin and a pale prothallus (the initial fungal growth stage of the lichen).

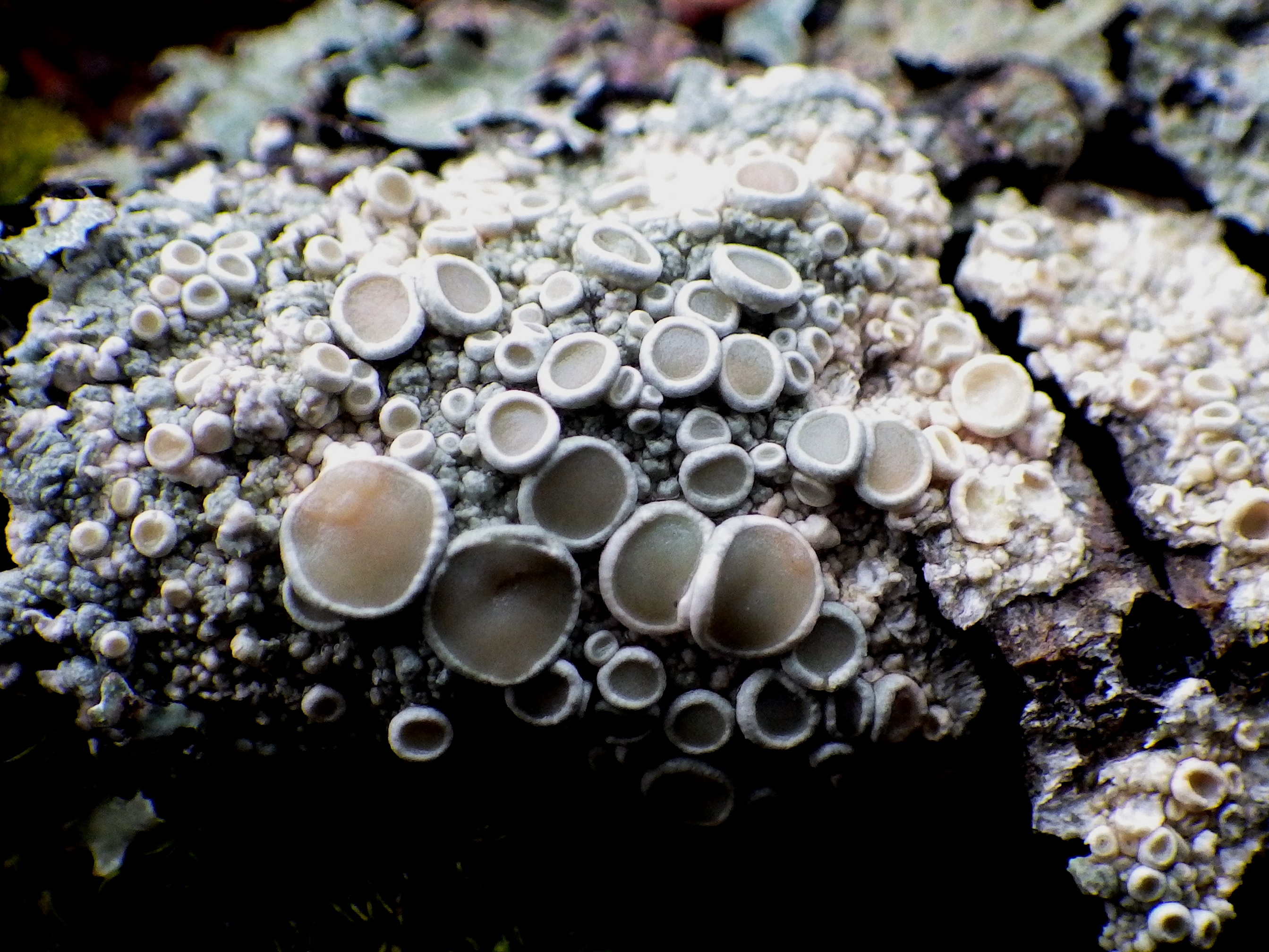
Closeup of apothecia

The apothecia, or reproductive structures, are usually frequent. They start off immersed and closed, but eventually become rounded or irregular in shape. These apothecia can be scattered or densely packed and are sessile, meaning they sit directly on the thallus without a stalk. The thalline exciple, which is the rim around the apothecia, is thick and wavy. The disc, or the central part of the apothecia, can reach up to 5 mm in diameter (sometimes up to 8 mm) and ranges in colour from pale brown to dull orange-pink. It can be concave to flat and is either not pruinose or only translucently so, with a surface that is often roughened (scabrose). The epithecium, the uppermost layer of cells in the apothecia, is granular and these granules dissolve in potassium hydroxide (K) solution.

The ascospores of Ochrolechia tartarea are broadly ellipsoidal, measuring between 40 to 70 micrometres (μm) in length and 20 to 40 μm in width.

In chemical spot tests, the thallus reacts as follows: C+ (orange-red), K+ (pale yellow), KC+ (red), and both Pd− and UV−. The apothecial disc is also C+ (red), K−, KC+ (red), and Pd−. These reactions are due to the presence of gyrophoric acid and trace amounts of lecanoric acid, along with other unknown compounds.

=== Similar species ===
In Australia, Ochrolechia insularis can resemble O. tartarea because both form irregularly warty to knoblike (nodulate-papillate) surfaces on rock (saxicolous). They differ in several clear ways: O. insularis has a smooth, glossy upper surface, whereas O. tartarea is granular to powdery (tartareous); O. insularis lacks a surrounding pale border (prothallus), which is present around O. tartarea; the upper surface of O. tartarea ranges from pale to dark grey, while that of O. insularis is white; and the inner tissue (medulla) of O. insularis turns red with bleach (C+ red) but shows no reaction in O. tartarea (C−).

== Habitat and distribution ==
Ochrolechia tartarea grows on acidic rocks and shallow soil in moist conditions, primarily at higher elevations. The species is documented from the Alpine regions of Austria, Switzerland, France, and Italy. In Britain and Ireland it forms thick crusts on boulders and other siliceous rock, may overgrow moss-lichen heaths, and is only occasional on leached, acid bark. It favours wind-exposed uplands and other oceanic or montane environments with high rainfall; it is widespread across Britain and Ireland but becomes rare or absent in central and south-east England.

In Central Europe it occupies non-calcareous silicate rocks, often with a thin humus cover, at light but frequently shaded sites that are repeatedly and intensely wetted, for example relatively sheltered faces of otherwise exposed crags. Ecologically, it prefers acidic substrates and thrives in moist, rain-exposed habitats; it tolerates only moderate light and is often found in the plant community Parmelietum omphalodis. Continental lowland reports are prone to confusion with similar taxa; for example, all published records from Poland proved to be misidentifications. Within Germany it is recorded chiefly from upland and alpine regions (e.g. the Harz and Alps), with scattered or doubtful occurrences elsewhere. In Asia, it has been recorded from South Korea. Although it has been reported from China on several occasions, the specimens associated with those collections have since been assigned to O. trochophora. Similarly, although reported from Antarctica, re-examination of historical specimens revealed instead a mixture of O. antarctica and O. frigida.

== Historical use and conservation ==
Ochrolechia tartarea was historically an important lichen used to make cudbear, a red dye patented in Scotland in 1758. The popularity of cudbear led to over-harvesting and depletion of O. tartarea populations in Scotland during the Industrial Revolution. As local Scottish stocks became exhausted, additional O. tartarea was imported from Norway and other parts of northern Europe to meet continuing demand. While O. tartarea was historically abundant across Britain and southwestern Norway, its distribution has contracted significantly, with the species now occurring only in scattered populations within these regions. The most dramatic declines occurred near historical dye production centres, where the lichen has largely disappeared. A similar pattern of rarity has emerged in Maine and the Maritime provinces of Canada, where O. tartarea now persists only on exposed subalpine rocky surfaces. A 2019 study used High-performance liquid chromatography coupled with tandem mass spectrometry (HPLC–MS/MS) analysis to try to identify characteristic chemical markers that could distinguish dyes made from O. tartarea versus other lichen species like Lasallia pustulata and Roccella tinctoria.

== See also ==
- List of lichens named by Carl Linnaeus
