= Chiodecton xanthonosorediatum =

Scientific classification
- Domain: Eukaryota
- Kingdom: Fungi
- Division: Ascomycota
- Class: Arthoniomycetes
- Order: Arthoniales
- Family: Roccellaceae
- Genus: Chiodecton
- Species: C. xanthonosorediatum

Binomial name
- Chiodecton xanthonosorediatum Aptroot (2020)

Species of lichen

Chiodecton xanthonosorediatum is a species of corticolous (bark-dwelling), crustose lichen in the family Roccellaceae. It is native to Brazil, where it occurs in the Atlantic Forest. The lichen was formally described as a new species in 2020 by Dutch lichenologist André Aptroot. The type specimen was collected by the author from Serra da Bodoquena (Mato Grosso do Sul) at an altitude of 460 m (1,510 ft).

Chiodecton xanthonosorediatum is characterized by its thallus and soredia containing lichexanthone and trentepohlioid green algae. The lichen has a crustose, granular thallus with a pale greenish-white hue and an uneven, dull surface. The thallus is up to 0.2 mm thick and surrounded by a thin black prothallus. Its photobiont, Trentepohlia, is an alga with cells measuring up to 10 μm in diameter. The lichen forms low hemispherical soralia, which later merge, and farinose (mealy) soredia cover the entire surface of the soralia. Ascomata and pycnidia have not been observed in this species.

The chemistry of Chiodecton xanthonosorediatum reveals a UV+ (yellow) reaction for the thallus and soredia, while C, P, and K spot tests show no reaction. Thin-layer chromatography analysis detects the presence of lichexanthone, a lichen product found in the cortex. Chiodecton xanthonosorediatum shares similarities with C. complexum, particularly in the structure of the soralia, but its distinguishing feature is the presence of lichexanthone. The only other known species within the genus containing lichexanthone is C. lichexanthonicum.
