= Astrothelium variabile =

Scientific classification
- Kingdom: Fungi
- Division: Ascomycota
- Class: Dothideomycetes
- Order: Trypetheliales
- Family: Trypetheliaceae
- Genus: Astrothelium
- Species: A. variabile

Binomial name
- Astrothelium variabile Flakus & Aptroot (2016)

Species of lichen

Astrothelium variabile is a species of corticolous (bark-dwelling) lichen in the family Trypetheliaceae. Found in Bolivia, it was formally described as a new species in 2016 by the lichenologists Adam Flakus and André Aptroot. The type specimen was collected near the biological station in the Beni Biological Station Biosphere Reserve (Yacuma Province, Beni Department) at an altitude of 175 m (574 ft); there, in a lowland Amazon forest, it was found growing on bark in Beni savanna. It is only known to occur in this type of habitat in Bolivia. The species epithet variabile alludes to the variable amounts of lichexanthone in different regions of the thallus. This is a lichen product that causes parts of the lichen to fluoresce when lit with a long-wavelength UV light. Astrothelium ochroleucoides is somewhat similar in external appearance, but it has smaller ascospores than A. variabile.
