= Cladonia lichexanthonica =

Scientific classification
- Domain: Eukaryota
- Kingdom: Fungi
- Division: Ascomycota
- Class: Lecanoromycetes
- Order: Lecanorales
- Family: Cladoniaceae
- Genus: Cladonia
- Species: C. lichexanthonica

Binomial name
- Cladonia lichexanthonica Aptroot & Cáceres (2018)

Species of lichen

Cladonia lichexanthonica is a species of saxicolous (rock-dwelling) squamulose lichen in the family Cladoniaceae. It is widely distributed in Brazil.

== Taxonomy ==
The species was formally described as new to science in 2018 by the lichenologists André Aptroot and Marcela Eugenia da Silva Cáceres. The type specimen was collected by the authors from the Morro do Pai Inácio (in Chapada Diamantina National Park) at an elevation between 1,050 and 1,140 m (3,440 and 3,740 ft); here the lichen was found growing on siliceous sandstone rock in a transitional forest.

== Description ==
The lichen has a squamulose (scaley) thallus measuring up to 10 cm (4 in) in diameter; this consists of a 5-millimetre (0.2 in) thick crust comprising individual crowded squamules, pale-olive green to olive brown, measuring 1–5 mm in size. The specific epithet lichexanthonica refers to the presence of lichexanthone, a secondary compound that was not previously known to occur in genus Cladonia.

== Distribution ==
Cladonia lichexanthonica was originally known to occur only at the type locality (part of the Chapada Diamantina mountains), and was only known from the type specimen. Since then, its known range has expanded considerably, having been recorded from the states of Minas Gerais, Paraná, Sergipe, and Rio de Janeiro.

== See also ==
- List of Cladonia species
