= Astrothelium corallinum =

Scientific classification
- Kingdom: Fungi
- Division: Ascomycota
- Class: Dothideomycetes
- Order: Trypetheliales
- Family: Trypetheliaceae
- Genus: Astrothelium
- Species: A. corallinum

Binomial name
- Astrothelium corallinum Aptroot (2016)

Species of lichen

Astrothelium corallinum is a species of corticolous (bark-dwelling), crustose lichen in the family Trypetheliaceae. Found in Guyana, it was formally described as a new species in 2016 by André Aptroot. The type specimen was collected from Rain Mountain, southeast of the village in Paruima Mission (Upper Mazaruni District) at an altitude of 500 m (1,600 ft); here, it was found growing on the smooth bark of trees in a rainforest. The lichen has a smooth, somewhat shiny thallus that covers areas of up to 8 cm (3.1 in) in diameter; the entire thallus is surrounded by a thin (0.3 mm) black line that is the prothallus. The whitish parts of the pseudostromata will fluoresce yellow when lit with a long-wavelength UV light; this is due to the presence of lichexanthone, a lichen product. The thallus, however, does not contain lichexanthone, which distinguishes it from the similar species A. ochroleucoides.
