= Marcelaria benguelensis =

Scientific classification
- Domain: Eukaryota
- Kingdom: Fungi
- Division: Ascomycota
- Class: Dothideomycetes
- Order: Trypetheliales
- Family: Trypetheliaceae
- Genus: Marcelaria
- Species: M. benguelensis

Binomial name
- Marcelaria benguelensis (Müll.Arg.) Aptroot, Nelsen & Parnmen (2013)

Synonyms
- Bathelium benguelense Müll.Arg. (1885); Laurera benguelensis (Müll.Arg.) Zahlbr. (1922); Laurera subbenguelensis Upreti & Ajay Singh (1987)

Species of lichen

Marcelaria benguelensis is a tropical species of corticolous (bark-dwelling) and crustose lichen in the family Trypetheliaceae. It is found in continental southeast Asia.

== Taxonomy ==
The lichen was first formally described in 1885 by Swiss botanist Johannes Müller Argoviensis as a species of Bathelium. The type specimen was collected in India. In 1922, Alexander Zahlbruckner transferred it to the genus Laurera. The taxon was one of three species transferred to the newly circumscribed genus Marcelaria in 2013.

The taxon Laurera subbenguelensis described in 1987 by Dalip Kumar Upreti and Ajay Singh from specimens found in Kerala, was later determined to be synonymous with Marcelaria benguelensis.

== Description ==
Marcelaria benguelensis has an olive-green, crustose thallus with a surface that often has an orange pruina. The ascomata resemble warts on the thallus surface; they are 0.6–1 mm in diameter, and cluster together in groups of 2 to 6. The ascospores, which number 8 per ascus, are muriform (divided into chambers) with 15 to 23 septa running transversely through the spore and 3 to 7 that are longitudinal; the spores measure 50–80 by 17–23 μm and have a gelatinous sheath that is 3–12 μm thick.

Marcelaria benguelensis contains the secondary compounds parietin and teloschistin (both anthraquinone pigments) and lichexanthone. The latter substance causes the thallus to fluoresce a yellow colour when shone with a UV light. Laboratory tests have shown that extracts of the lichen have antimicrobial properties, which are attributed to the presence of lichexanthone.

== Distribution ==
The lichen has been recorded from Cambodia, India, Myanmar, the Philippines, and Thailand.
