= Griseoxanthone C =

Chemical compound found in some lichens

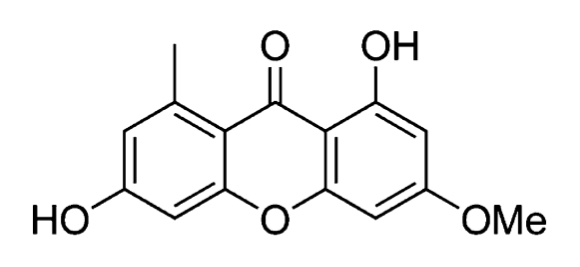

Names
- IUPAC name 1,6-Dihydroxy-3-methoxy-8-methylxanthen-9-one

Identifiers
CAS Number	3569-83-3
3D model (JSmol)	Interactive image
ChEBI	CHEBI:181512
ChEMBL	ChEMBL4081067
ChemSpider	4526854
PubChem CID	5377910
UNII	MJH6MPF38T
CompTox Dashboard (EPA)	DTXSID001234012
- InChI: InChI=1S/C15H12O5/c1-7-3-8(16)4-11-13(7)15(18)14-10(17)5-9(19-2)6-12(14)20-11/h3-6,16-17H,1-2H3 Key: UIKVQKMDLQHSKA-UHFFFAOYSA-N
- SMILES: CC1=CC(=CC2=C1C(=O)C3=C(C=C(C=C3O2)OC)O)O

Properties
Chemical formula	C_{15}H_{12}O_{5}
Molar mass	272.256 g·mol^{−1}
Appearance	yellowish needles
Melting point	253–255 °C (487–491 °F; 526–528 K)
- Except where otherwise noted, data are given for materials in their standard state (at 25 °C [77 °F], 100 kPa). Infobox references

Griseoxanthone C is an organic compound in the structural class of chemicals known as xanthones. Its chemical formula is 1,6-dihydroxy-3-methoxy-8-methylxanthen-9-one, and its molecular formula is C_{15}H_{12}O_{5}. It is found in a plant and some fungi, including a lichen.

== History ==
Griseoxanthone C was first isolated from the fungus Penicillium patulum by McMaster and colleagues in 1960. They were investigating the biosynthesis of the somewhat structurally related compound griseofulvin and discovered it in the residual material of the growth medium containing the fungi. A year later, another group studying griseofulvin biosynthesis discovered that the production of griseoxanthone C could be induced by inhibiting the chlorination of griseophenone C (an intermediate in the biosynthetic pathway leading to griseofulvin), and that griseoxanthone C could be created chemically from griseophenone C. Jayalakshmi and colleagues proposed a chemical synthesis of griseoxanthone C in 1974.

== Properties ==
In its purified form, griseoxanthone C exists as yellowish needles with a melting point of 253–255 °C (487–491 °F). An ethanolic solution of griseoxanthone C reacts with iron(III) chloride to produce a violet-brown colour. Its ultraviolet spectrum has four peaks of maximum absorption (λ_{max}) at 242, 269, 309, and 340 nm.

In laboratory tests, griseoxanthone C showed strong antibiotic effects toward Bacillus subtilis and methicillin-resistant Staphylococcus aureus. It also has strong cytotoxicity to Hep2 liver cancer cells in in vitro experiments.

== Occurrence ==
In 1992, John Elix and Caroline Crook reported griseoxanthone C from the lichen Lecanora vinetorum. It has since been reported from various other species, including the flowers of the plant Ficus hookeriana, the fungi Fusarium equiseti, Penicillium concentricum, and Urocladium.

== See also ==
- Lichexanthone
