= Sagenidiopsis isidiata =

Scientific classification
- Domain: Eukaryota
- Kingdom: Fungi
- Division: Ascomycota
- Class: Arthoniomycetes
- Order: Arthoniales
- Family: Roccellaceae
- Genus: Sagenidiopsis
- Species: S. isidiata

Binomial name
- Sagenidiopsis isidiata G.Thor, Elix, Lücking & Sipman (2011)

Species of lichen

Sagenidiopsis isidiata is a species of corticolous (bark-dwelling) byssoid lichen in the family Roccellaceae. Found in tropical montane rainforests throughout Central America, South America, and the Antilles, it was described as new to science in 2011. The lichen is characterised by its cream-coloured to greyish thallus and numerous pseudoisidia, which are small, cylindrical outgrowths on its surface.

== Taxonomy ==
Sagenidiopsis isidiata was first scientifically described by lichenologists Göran Thor, John Elix, Robert Lücking, and Harrie Sipman. The type specimen was collected in the Biotopo del Quetzal in Baja Verapaz, Guatemala, from a montane rainforest habitat at an altitude of 1,600–1,800 m (5,200–5,900 ft). The species name isidiata refers to the frequent presence of pseudoisidia on the thallus surface.

The first author of this species had known about it for about 20 years, but it remained undescribed due to its unclear generic position. It is superficially similar to byssoid genera in the order Arthoniales, such as Crypthonia, Dichosporidium, and Herpothallon in the broad sense. Sagenidiopsis isidiata is distinct from its South American relative Sagenidiopsis undulata, as the latter lacks pseudoisidia and produces apothecia. The presence of diploschistesic acid in S. isidiata is unusual, as this lichen product was previously known to occur only in Diploschistes species.

== Description ==
The thallus of Sagenidiopsis isidiata can grow up to 10 cm (4 in) in diameter, with several thalli of different sizes often intermixed. It is cream-coloured to greyish and loosely appressed to the substrate, and surrounded by a dark brown prothallus, up to 5 mm wide, comprising interwoven and radiating hyphae. Pseudoisidia are numerous, cylindrical, and unbranched or sparsely branched, reaching up to 0.8 by 0.5 mm in size. Photobiont cells are single or in short, irregular threads, measuring 23–31 by 17–25 μm. The photobiont is trentepohlioid, possible Trentepohlia abietina. Although neither ascomata nor pycnidia were observed in the original collections of this species, they were present in later collections made from the Antilles. They have a hypothecium that is thick and carbonised, and 3-septate ascospores with dimensions of 30–40 by 3.5–4.5 μm, which is similar to those of S. undulata. Its secondary chemistry includes diploschistesic acid as a major substance, and minor amounts of lecanoric acid. The expected results of chemical lichen spot tests on the thallus are C+ (red), K−, PD−, and UV+ (white).

== Habitat and distribution ==
Sagenidiopsis isidiata has been found in several locations across Central and South America, though its distribution remains rather limited. It grows on the bark of trees in tropical montane rainforests, usually at elevations between 1,600 and 2,200 m (5,200 and 7,200 ft). It was reported from Curaçao in the Lesser Antilles in 2014.
