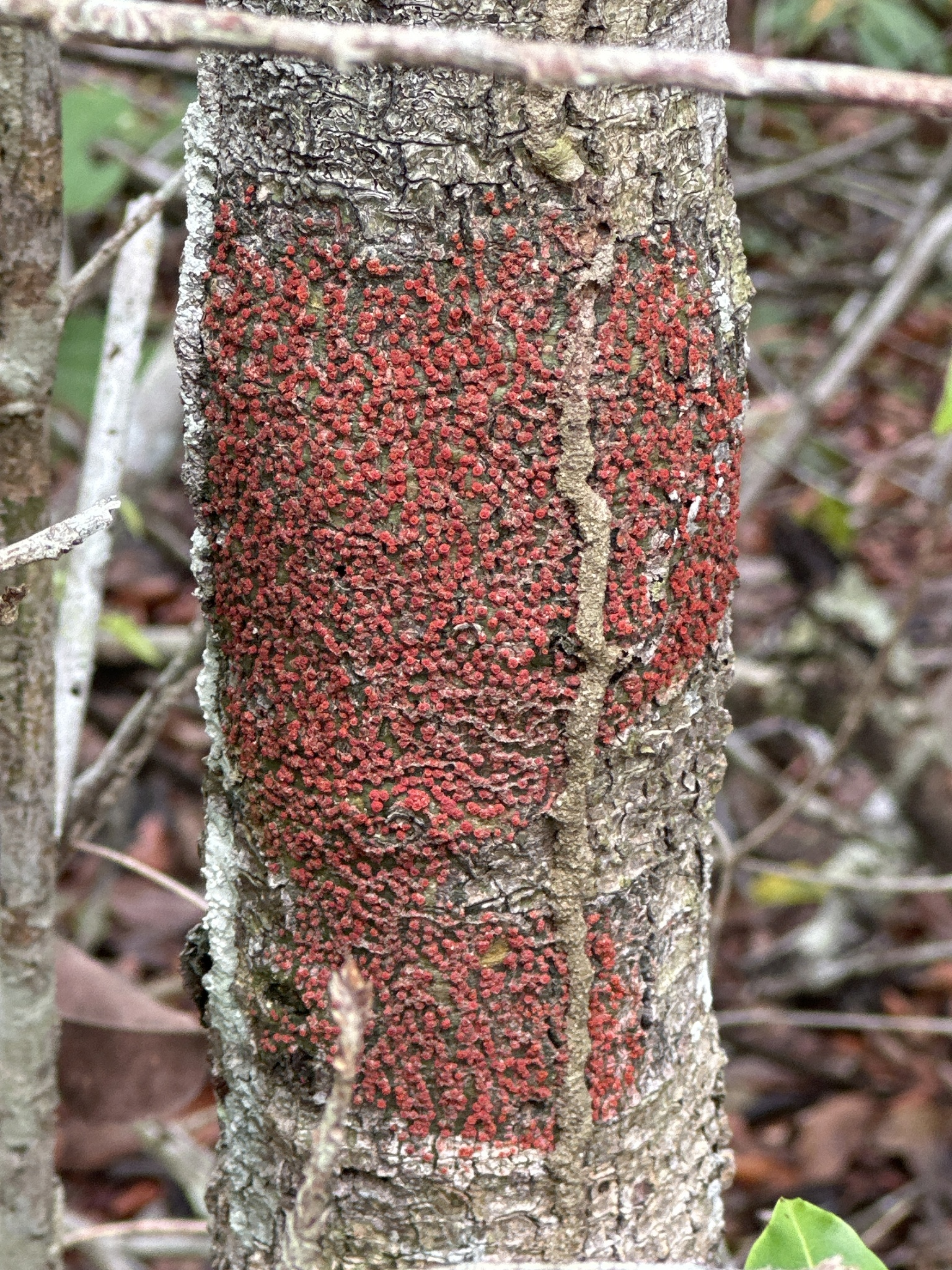
- Marcelaria purpurina

Scientific classification
- Kingdom: Fungi
- Division: Ascomycota
- Class: Dothideomycetes
- Order: Trypetheliales
- Family: Trypetheliaceae
- Genus: Marcelaria; Aptroot, Nelsen & Parnmen (2013)

Type species
- Marcelaria purpurina (Nyl.) Aptroot, Nelsen & Parnmen (2013)

Synonyms
- Buscalionia Sambo (1940)

= Marcelaria =

Genus of lichens

Marcelaria is a genus of crustose lichens in the family Trypetheliaceae. It has three species. These lichens grow as crusty patches on tree bark and are recognised by their bright orange, yellow, or red colouring. They produce distinctive flask-shaped fruiting bodies that are vividly pigmented and sit directly on the lichen's surface. The genus is found mainly in tropical regions of Asia, Africa, and the Americas.

== Taxonomy ==
The genus was circumscribed in 2013 by André Aptroot, Matthew P. Nelsen, and Sittiporn Parnmen, with Marcelaria purpurina assigned as the type species. The genus contains species that were previously in the Laurera purpurina species complex. Species in Marcelaria contain secondary compounds such as red, orange, and yellow anthraquinones, and sometimes lichexanthone. The genus name honours Brazilian lichenologist Marcela Cáceres.

In 2016, Aptroot and Nepi made a formal proposal to conserve the name Marcelaria over Buscalionia. This decision was necessitated by the rediscovery of type material originally described in 1940 by Maria Cengia Sambo as Buscalionia rubra, which technically should take priority as per the rules of botanical nomenclature. Given the widespread recognition and use of the name Marcelaria, especially for the type species M. purpurina, the authors advocated for its conservation to maintain clarity and consistency in lichenological studies. The proposal was rejected by the Nomenclature Committee for Fungi in 2023, who noted that the authors missed a critical 1953 annotation that identified the type of Buscalionia (B. rubra) as conspecific with Laurera purpurina, a species central to Marcelaria. Considering this oversight, the relatively short period during which Marcelaria had been used, and the fact that only three new combinations would be required if Buscalionia were adopted instead, the committee recommended against the conservation of Marcelaria.

== Description ==
Marcelaria forms a crust-like thallus on tree bark (corticolous). Part of the thallus can sit within the outer bark layer (endoperidermal). The surface "skin" (cortex) is thin, firm and slightly cartilage-like, and is built from hyphae arranged like vertical threads (prosoplectenchymatous). The photosynthetic partner is from the green algal genus Trentepohlia.

Sexual fruiting bodies are abundant and perithecoid—i.e. they resemble tiny, flask-like, single-chambered warts (unilocular) that sit directly on the thallus without a stalk (sessile). They occur singly or in small groups, but do not merge into a larger compound structure (not pseudostromatic). Their outer covering is vividly pigmented in bright orange-yellow to red, and there is usually a visible split between the inner wall of the fruit body and the surrounding covering tissue. This covering is formed mainly by a thick, gelatinised inner cortex that turns green when treated with potassium hydroxide solution (the standard "K" spot test used by lichenologists).

Inside the fruiting bodies, the jelly-like matrix (hamathecium) contains thin, straight filaments that branch and interconnect (paraphysoids) and do not react with iodine (IKI-negative). The asci have two separable wall layers (bitunicate), show a broad, flat apical chamber (ocular chamber), are club-shaped with a short stalk, and are also IKI-negative. The spores are colourless, multi-celled with both cross- and longitudinal walls (muriform), oblong-oval to ellipsoid or spindle-shaped, lack a dominant median septum, and have an inner spore wall (endospore) with rounded internal spaces (lumina). Asexual structures (pycnidia) have a tiny pore-like opening (a punctiform ostiole) and a characteristically brain-like, lobed interior; they produce colourless, rod-shaped conidia. Chemically, species contain several anthraquinone pigments in red, orange and yellow tones (sometimes concentrated in either the thallus or the fruiting bodies), and lichexanthone is often present.

== Species ==
- Marcelaria benguelensis (Müll.Arg.) Aptroot, Nelsen & Parnmen (2013) – continental southeast Asia
- Marcelaria cumingii (Mont.) Aptroot, Nelsen & Parnmen (2013) – southeast Asia
- Marcelaria purpurina (Nyl.) Aptroot, Nelsen & Parnmen (2013) – neotropics; tropical West Africa
