= Astrothelium octosporoides =

Scientific classification
- Kingdom: Fungi
- Division: Ascomycota
- Class: Dothideomycetes
- Order: Trypetheliales
- Family: Trypetheliaceae
- Genus: Astrothelium
- Species: A. octosporoides

Binomial name
- Astrothelium octosporoides Aptroot & Lücking (2016)

Synonyms
- Bathelium octosporum Zahlbr. (1902); Laurera octospora (Zahlbr.) Zahlbr. (1922)

Species of lichen-forming fungus

Astrothelium octosporoides is a species of crustose lichen-forming fungus in the family Trypetheliaceae. It was introduced as a replacement name (nomen novum) by André Aptroot and Robert Lücking for the taxon originally described as Bathelium octosporum in 1902 (later transferred to Laurera), a name that cannot be used in Astrothelium because a different Astrothelium octosporum already exists. The type material was collected in Brazil (Teresópolis) by von Höhnel (collection number 150; holotype in the herbarium of the Natural History Museum, Vienna).

The thallus has a smooth to uneven, olive-green surface with an outer skin-like layer (corticate). The fruiting bodies (ascomata) are of the trypethelioid type, with pore-like openings (ostioles) at the apex; they occur singly or in irregular clusters and measure 0.8–1.5 mm across. They are partly sunken in the thallus (erumpent) to prominent, hemispherical in shape, and covered by a layer of thallus tissue, with a colourless hamathecium (the sterile tissue between the asci). Each ascus contains eight colourless (hyaline) ascospores that are spindle-shaped (fusiform) and divided by both transverse and longitudinal walls (densely muriform), measuring 150–190 × 40–45 μm, without a distinctly thickened central cross-wall; they do not stain with iodine (IKI−). No lichen substances were detected by thin-layer chromatography (thallus and pseudostromata UV−, K−).

Its Brazilian distribution include the states São Paulo and Rio Grande do Sul.

== See also ==
- List of lichens of Brazil
