= Cladonia inflata =

Scientific classification
- Kingdom: Fungi
- Division: Ascomycota
- Class: Lecanoromycetes
- Order: Lecanorales
- Family: Cladoniaceae
- Genus: Cladonia
- Species: C. inflata

Binomial name
- Cladonia inflata Aptroot & Cáceres (2018)

Species of lichen

Cladonia inflata is a rare species of terricolous (ground-dwelling) lichen in the family Cladoniaceae. Found in Bahia, Brazil, it was formally described as a new species in 2018 by the lichenologists André Aptroot and Marcela Eugenia da Silva Cáceres. The type specimen was collected by the authors from Palmeiras, on the Mount of Pai Inácio (part of the Chapada Diamantina mountains), at an altitude between 1,050 and 1,140 m (3,440 and 3,740 ft); here the lichen was found growing on siliceous sandstone rock in a transitional forest. Cladonia inflata is only known to occur at the type locality, and is only known from the type specimen. At this location the lichen is conspicuous but not abundant, and forms extensive mats with many other Cladonia species, such as C. bahiana, C. clathrata, C. dissecta, C. divaricata, C. friabilis, C. furfuracea, C. metaminiata, C. miniata, C. obscurata, C. parvipes, C. pityrophylla, C. polyscypha, C. salmonea, C. secundana, and C. substellata. The lichen has a fruticose (bushy), mineral-grey thallus that consists of upright hollow podetia measuring about 4 to 7 cm (1.6 to 2.8 in) high, atop a cushion up to 10 cm (4 in) in diameter. It contains the secondary compound fumarprotocetraric acid. The specific epithet inflata refers to the inflated thallus of the lichen.

== See also ==
- List of Cladonia species
