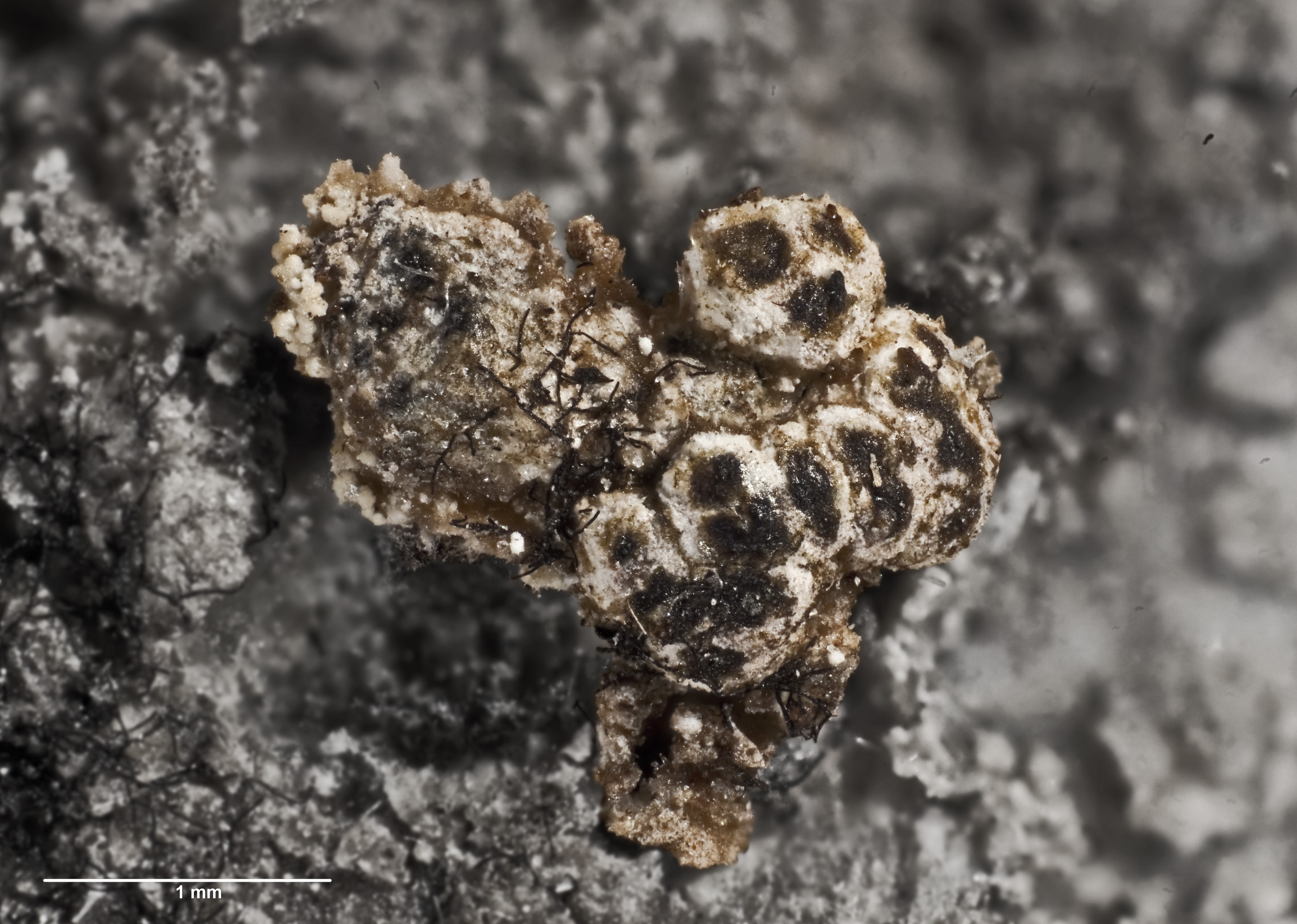

Scientific classification
- Domain: Eukaryota
- Kingdom: Fungi
- Division: Ascomycota
- Class: Arthoniomycetes
- Order: Arthoniales
- Family: Roccellaceae
- Genus: Chiodecton
- Species: C. montanum

Binomial name
- Chiodecton montanum G.Thor (1990)

= Chiodecton montanum =

Species of lichen

Chiodecton montanum is a species of saxicolous (rock-dwelling), lichen in the family Roccellaceae. It was formally described as a new species in 1990 by the Swedish lichenologist Göran Thor. Chiodecton montanum is distinguished by its yellow pigments (secalonic acid derivatives and skyrin) in the medulla, a thallus that is tightly attached to the substrate, and a hymenium infused with oil droplets and granules.

== Description ==
Chiodecton montanum has a thallus (lichen body) that can be either smooth and very thin or slightly roughened (verruculose), with a thickness of 0.5–1 mm. Its colour varies from dull reddish-brown to grey-brown or yellowish-grey. When tested with potassium hydroxide solution (K+), parts of the thallus react by turning yellow or reddish-yellow, indicating the presence of secalonic acid pigments. The thallus is typically bordered by a black prothallus, a thin layer of fungal growth that helps define the lichen's boundary, and can form large, continuous patches that cover areas of up to 50–100 cm across.

The fertile structures, known as stromata, are scattered or sometimes fused into brain-like clusters. These stromata range from 0.5 to 2 mm wide individually, but when clustered, they can reach up to 3.5 mm across. Each stroma is constricted at the base and roughly globose (rounded), often covered with a whitish powdery coating (pruinose). The apothecia, which are perithecioid (flask-shaped), are very numerous on each stroma, with more than 10 per structure. The visible part of the apothecia, or disc, is typically small and speck-like, although it can occasionally widen up to 0.5 mm.

The exciple, the outer wall of the apothecium, is 10–20 μm thick on the sides, while the hymenium, the spore-producing layer, is 100–140 μm thick and densely filled with oil droplets. The asci (spore sacs) measure 75–90 μm long and 10–15 μm wide, and the paraphysoids (filamentous structures that support the asci) are 1–1.5 μm thick. The ascospores themselves are 40–56 μm long and 3–5 μm wide. In addition, the conidia (asexual spores) are 11–16 μm long and 1 μm wide.

== Habitat and distribution ==
The lichen is found in New Zealand and Tasmania, where it grows in sheltered and moist rock crevices.
