= Sagenidiopsis =

Scientific classification
- Domain: Eukaryota
- Kingdom: Fungi
- Division: Ascomycota
- Class: Arthoniomycetes
- Order: Arthoniales
- Family: Roccellaceae
- Genus: Sagenidiopsis; R.W.Rogers & Hafellner (1987)

Type species
- Sagenidiopsis merrotsyi R.W.Rogers & Hafellner (1987)

Species
- S. atroalba S. isidiata S. merrotsii S. subconfluentica S. undulata

Synonyms
- Chiodecton sect. Byssophoropsis Vain. (1890); Byssophoropsis (Vain.) Tehler (1993)

Genus of lichens

Sagenidiopsis is a genus of lichen-forming fungi in the family Arthoniaceae. It was circumscribed in 1987 by lichenologists Roderick Rogers and Josef Hafellner to contain the type species S. merrotsii, found in Australia. The characteristic features of the genus include the byssoid (cottony) thallus and bitunicate asci (enclosed in a double wall) that lack amyloid structures that are apparent in the thallus.

== Description ==
Sagenidiopsis is characterized by its distinctive byssoid (cotton-like) thallus, which forms extensive, thick, and spongy crusts without a protective outer cortex layer. The thallus structure is differentiated into two parts: an upper layer containing loosely woven fungal hyphae that incorporate filaments of the algal partner Trentepohlia, and a lower layer consisting purely of fungal tissue without algae. The fungal component penetrates the algal cells with specialized structures called haustoria to extract nutrients.

Reproductive structures (ascomata) of Sagenidiopsis begin as closed, globular bodies that later open to develop a circular disc. These structures have a distinctive margin covered in free hyphae similar to those of the thallus, which conceals the proper exciple (the true rim of the fruiting body). Inside, the asci (spore-producing cells) are fissitunicate (having a double wall that splits during spore release) with a long stalk. Unlike related genera, the asci lack any amyloid structures (parts that stain blue with iodine) in the tholus (tip region). The spores are hyaline (colourless), thin-walled, and divided by transverse septa.

When first described, the genus contained only a single species, Sagenidiopsis merrotsii, which was found in cool temperate rainforests of the Mcpherson Range in eastern Australia. This species grows on tree trunks and overhanging rock faces in misty, humid environments, particularly near Nothofagus moorei (Antarctic beech) forests. The thallus appears orange when fresh but fades to greyish-green or greyish-yellow when dry.

The byssoid thallus form is not unique to Sagenidiopsis but represents an ecological adaptation that has evolved independently in several unrelated lichen families. This growth form, with its high surface area-to-weight ratio, appears to be specialized for efficient absorption of water vapour from humid air in environments where surfaces rarely receive direct rainfall or water flow.

== Species ==
- Sagenidiopsis atroalba Jagad.Ram (2014)
- Sagenidiopsis isidiata G.Thor, Elix, Lücking & Sipman (2011)
- Sagenidiopsis merrotsyi R.W.Rogers & Hafellner (1987)
- Sagenidiopsis subconfluentica Elix (2009) – Australia
- Sagenidiopsis undulata (Fée) Egea, Tehler, Torrente & Sipman (1995)
