= Lecanora lichexanthona =

Scientific classification
- Domain: Eukaryota
- Kingdom: Fungi
- Division: Ascomycota
- Class: Lecanoromycetes
- Order: Lecanorales
- Family: Lecanoraceae
- Genus: Lecanora
- Species: L. lichexanthona

Binomial name
- Lecanora lichexanthona Guderley (2000)

Species of lichen

Lecanora lichexanthona is a species of crustose and saxicolous (rock-dwelling) lichen in the family Lecanoraceae. Found in Brazil, it was formally described as a new species in 2000 by lichenologist Roland Guderley. The type specimen was collected by Klaus Kalb in a closed cerradão between Rio Verde de Mato Grosso and Coxim where it was found growing on siliceous rock. The specific epithet lichexanthona refers to the presence of the chemical lichexanthone as a major secondary in the lichen. Other compounds in the lichen are atranorin, hybocarpone, constipatic acid, and norlichexanthone (the last three occurring as minor compounds). Lecanora lichexanthona is only known to occur in cerradão formations in central Brazil, at altitudes between 500 and 850 m (1,640 and 2,790 ft).

== See also ==
- List of Lecanora species
