= Cupania cinerea =

Scientific classification
- Kingdom: Plantae
- Clade: Tracheophytes
- Clade: Angiosperms
- Clade: Eudicots
- Clade: Rosids
- Order: Sapindales
- Family: Sapindaceae
- Genus: Cupania
- Species: C. cinerea

Binomial name
- Cupania cinerea Poepp.

Species of flowering plant

Cupania cinerea is a plant species in the family Sapindaceae. It was described as a new species in 1843 by German botanist Eduard Friedrich Poeppig. The plant is native to South America (Bolivia, Brazil, Colombia, Peru, and Venezuela) and Central America (Costa Rica, Ecuador, Honduras, Nicaragua, and Panamá).

Several phytochemicals occur in the plant, including cupacinoside, cupacinoxepin, scopoletin, caryophyllene oxide, two bisabolene sesquiterpenes, lichexanthone, gustastatin, lupenone, betulone, 17β,21β-epoxyhopan-3-one, taraxerol, and taraxerone.
