= Aggregatorygma triseptatum =

Scientific classification
- Kingdom: Fungi
- Division: Ascomycota
- Class: Lecanoromycetes
- Order: Graphidales
- Family: Graphidaceae
- Genus: Aggregatorygma
- Species: A. triseptatum

Binomial name
- Aggregatorygma triseptatum M.Cáceres, Aptroot & Lücking (2014)
- Holotype: Fazenda São Francisco, Brazil

Species of lichen

Aggregatorygma triseptatum is a species of lichen in the family Graphidaceae. First described in 2014 from collections near Porto Velho in Rondônia, it forms pale gray-green patches on tree bark with distinctive star-shaped clusters of narrow fruiting bodies. The species is characterized by extremely small spores with three cross-walls and two unidentified secondary metabolites. It grows in the shaded understory of undisturbed Amazon rainforest and has since been recorded in several Brazilian states.

== Taxonomy ==
Aggregatorygma triseptatum was introduced as a new genus and species by Marcela Cáceres, André Aptroot, and Robert Lücking in a survey of Graphidaceae from Rondônia. The holotype was collected on March 15, 2012 on tree bark in primary rainforest at Fazenda São Francisco, about 30 km (19 mi) north of Porto Velho at an elevation of 100 m (330 ft). The original diagnosis emphasized the combination of aggregated, branched lirellae and extremely small, 3-septate ascospores. Sequence accessions from the type corroborated that the taxon did not cluster with existing graphidoid genera.

In form, the species can resemble some Diorygma (such as D. poitaei and other small-spored taxa), but it differs in its distinctive clustering of lirellae, the consistently tiny, 3-septate spores, and its chemistry (two thin-layer chromatography (TLC) spots that do not match known standards). The authors therefore placed it in Aggregatorygma rather than expanding Diorygma.

== Description ==
The bark-dwelling thallus of Aggregatorygma triseptatum forms pale, gray-green patches with a very finely dusty surface; a thin white border (prothallus) may be present. In section it lacks a true cortex (i.e., no differentiated outer "skin" layer), and consists of a photobiont layer of green Trentepohlia algae over a thin, crystal-rich medulla.

Fruiting bodies are the key macroscopic feature: narrow, elongated apothecia (lirellae) occur in small, star-shaped clusters, mostly immersed in the thallus with only thin lips visible; each slit is typically 1–3 mm long. The lips often carry a light, powdery bloom (pruina). In section, the apothecial wall (excipulum) is pale and thin; the spore-bearing layer (hymenium) is clear and about 50–60 μm tall. The ascospores, which number eight per ascus, are hyaline, ellipsoid, and tiny (about 10–12 × 3.5–4 μm) with three cross walls; they show a violet-blue iodine staining reaction (I+), indicating amyloidy.

Standard spot tests on thin sections are negative (P–; K–), but TLC in solvent C shows two unidentified compounds as light gray-brown spots at about Rf 25 (major) and Rf 40 (minor).

== Habitat and distribution ==
The species was originally collected from primary rainforest in Rondônia, Brazil, where it grows on smooth tree bark (corticolous) in shaded understory conditions. All original verified material came from sites in or near Porto Velho, particularly well-preserved forest remnants within about 50 km (31 mi) of the city, at around 100 m (330 ft) elevation. It is treated as an understory specialist of undisturbed rainforest. The lichen has since been recorded in Amazonas, Pará, Tocantins, and Mato Grosso.
