= Aggregatorygma =

Scientific classification
- Domain: Eukaryota
- Kingdom: Fungi
- Division: Ascomycota
- Class: Lecanoromycetes
- Order: Graphidales
- Family: Graphidaceae
- Genus: Aggregatorygma; M.Cáceres, Aptroot & Lücking, 2014

Type species
- Aggregatorygma triseptatum M.Cáceres, Aptroot & Lücking, 2014

Genus of lichen

Aggregatorygma is a small genus of lichenized fungi in the family Graphidaceae.

It was circumscribed in 2014 by Marcela Cáceres, André Aptroot, and Robert Lücking as a monotypic genus, with Aggregatorygma triseptatum as its only species. Two species have since been added: Aggregatorygma submuriforme in 2020 and Aggregatorygma lichexanthonicum in 2022, both by Aptroot.

The genus name is a combination of two words. Aggregato is from the Latin word meaning "aggregated", while rygma is from the Ancient Greek word ρήγμα, meaning "crack".

Species in the genus are corticolous, growing on the bark of tree trunks in rainforest. All three species were first discovered in Brazil.
