= Aggregatorygma lichexanthonicum =

Scientific classification
- Kingdom: Fungi
- Division: Ascomycota
- Class: Lecanoromycetes
- Order: Graphidales
- Family: Graphidaceae
- Genus: Aggregatorygma
- Species: A. lichexanthonicum

Binomial name
- Aggregatorygma lichexanthonicum Aptroot (2022)
- Holotype: Reserva Cristalino, Mato Grosso, Brazil

Species of lichen

Aggregatorygma lichexanthonicum is a species of corticolous (tree-bark dwelling), crustose lichen in the family Graphidaceae. Found in Brazil, it is characterised by the presence of lichexanthone in its thallus.

== Type ==
The lichen was formally described in 2022 by the Dutch lichenologist André Aptroot. The type specimen was collected by the author in Reserva Cristalino in Mato Grosso, Brazil, at an altitude of 250–350 m (820–1,150 ft); there, it was found growing on tree bark within a primary rainforest. The species name alludes to its chemical marker, lichexanthone. This species is the third identified within its genus, all of which were described from Brazil.

== Description ==
The thallus of Aggregatorygma lichexanthonicum is crustose and continuous, extending up to about 20 cm (8 in) in diameter and up to 0.1 mm thick. It appears rather smooth and dull, almost white, and lacks a prothallus border. The photobiont within is trentepohlioid (green algae). Ascomata (fruiting bodies) are superficial on the thallus, sessile with a constricted base, initially solitary but soon dividing into aggregates of linear, simple or slightly branched lirellae within a pseudostroma that is distinctly lobate in outline. Pseudostromata measure 1–4 mm in width and 0.4–0.7 mm in height, with individual lirellae 0.2–0.4 mm wide and up to 3 mm long. The disc is pale grey and densely white pruinose, often showing splits or cracks. The epihymenium is brownish with numerous small crystals, likely calcium oxalate, while asci are dextrinoid. Ascospores, uniquely singular per ascus, are hyaline and densely muriform. Pycnidia have not been observed to occur in this species.

== Chemistry ==
Chemical analysis reveals the thallus to be UV+ (yellow) and the disc UV+ (bluish white), with spot tests for C, K, KC, and P being negative. Thin-layer chromatography shows the presence of lichexanthone.

== Habitat and distribution ==
Aggregatorygma lichexanthonicum is found exclusively on tree bark within primary rainforests in Brazil.
