= Crypthonia lichexanthonica =

Scientific classification
- Domain: Eukaryota
- Kingdom: Fungi
- Division: Ascomycota
- Class: Arthoniomycetes
- Order: Arthoniales
- Family: Arthoniaceae
- Genus: Crypthonia
- Species: C. lichexanthonica

Binomial name
- Crypthonia lichexanthonica A.A.Menezes, M.Cáceres & Aptroot (2013)

Species of lichen

Crypthonia lichexanthonica is a species of crustose and corticolous (bark-dwelling) lichen in the family Arthoniaceae. Found in Brazil, it was formally described as a new species in 2013 by Aline Anjos Menezes, Marcela Eugenia da Silva Cáceres, and André Aptroot. The type specimen was collected from the Chapada do Araripe (Ceará), at an altitude of 900 m (3,000 ft). Here, in Caatinga forest, it was found growing on the smooth bark of a tree. Crypthonia lichexanthonica is the only species in its genus to contain lichexanthone, a secondary chemical that causes the lichen to fluoresce yellow when shone with a UV light.
