= Chiodecton subordinatum =

Conservation status
- Data Deficient (IUCN 3.1)

Scientific classification
- Domain: Eukaryota
- Kingdom: Fungi
- Division: Ascomycota
- Class: Arthoniomycetes
- Order: Arthoniales
- Family: Roccellaceae
- Genus: Chiodecton
- Species: C. subordinatum

Binomial name
- Chiodecton subordinatum Nyl. (1867)

Species of lichen

Chiodecton subordinatum is a rare species of corticolous (bark-dwelling) crustose lichen in the family Roccellaceae. It is known only from a single location in Colombia and is currently classified as data deficient by the International Union for Conservation of Nature (IUCN) due to a lack of information about its population, habitat, and potential threats.

== Taxonomy ==
The species was first described by the Finnish botanist William Nylander in 1867. The current taxonomic placement of C. subordinatum within the genus Chiodecton is uncertain, as its affinity with the modern concept of the genus is not clear. A more specific taxonomic revision of the group is required to ascertain the current identity of the type specimen.

== Description ==
Chiodecton subordinatum has a crustose thallus that is whitish and opaque with dark margins. Its apothecia (reproductive structures) are found in stromatic bodies. The ascospores are fusiform (spindle-shaped) with three septa and measure 23 to 32 μm in length.

== Distribution and habitat ==
Chiodecton subordinatum is known only from a single record in the municipality of Piedecuesta, in the Santander Department of Colombia. It was found at an elevation of 1,200 m (3,900 ft) above sea level. The species grows as an epiphyte on trees in xerophytic enclaves (dry areas within otherwise moist environments).

== Conservation ==
The IUCN has classified Chiodecton subordinatum as data deficient due to the lack of information about its population size, distribution, ecological requirements, and potential threats. The species is protected under Resolution 0213 of 1977 in Colombia, which prohibits its use and commercialisation.
