= Lecanora vinetorum =

Scientific classification
- Domain: Eukaryota
- Kingdom: Fungi
- Division: Ascomycota
- Class: Lecanoromycetes
- Order: Lecanorales
- Family: Lecanoraceae
- Genus: Lecanora
- Species: L. vinetorum

Binomial name
- Lecanora vinetorum Poelt & Huneck (1968)

Species of lichen

Lecanora vinetorum is a rare species of crustose lichen in the family Lecanoraceae. Found in Central Europe, it was formally described as a new species in 1968 by lichenologists Josef Poelt and Siegfried Huneck. The type specimen was collected from the San Michele Appiano region of Trentino-Alto Adige (Bolzano Province); there it was found growing on vineyard frames. The species epithet vinetorum (Latin for "vineyard") refers to its habitat.

It is a member of the Lecanora varia species complex, which consists of about a dozen yellowish-green species that are related to L. varia.

A rare Central European lichen, Lecanora vinetorum occurs in Switzerland and northern Italy, at elevations between 270 and 780 m (890 and 2,560 ft). Although Lecanora lichens are typically saxicolous (rock-dwelling) species, L. vinetorum is remarkable for having adapted to growth on wood sprayed with copper-containing fungicides. This includes colonized trees (typically Prunus avium), and the sheltered tie-beams used in vineyard frames. Although the lichen is confined to small areas, it is locally abundant in habitats that do not have many other lichen species.

The compound griseoxanthone C was reported this species in 1992, the first time that substance had been reported from a lichen. It also contains the xanthone compound vinetorin.

== See also ==
- List of Lecanora species
