= Cupania elegans =

Scientific classification
- Kingdom: Plantae
- (unranked): Angiosperms
- (unranked): Eudicots
- (unranked): Rosids
- Order: Sapindales
- Family: Sapindaceae
- Genus: Cupania
- Species: C. elegans

Binomial name
- Cupania elegans L.Linden, 1893

Species of flowering plant

Cupania elegans is a horticultural name (a name that has never been validly published in scientific literature) for a plant in the family Sapindaceae.
