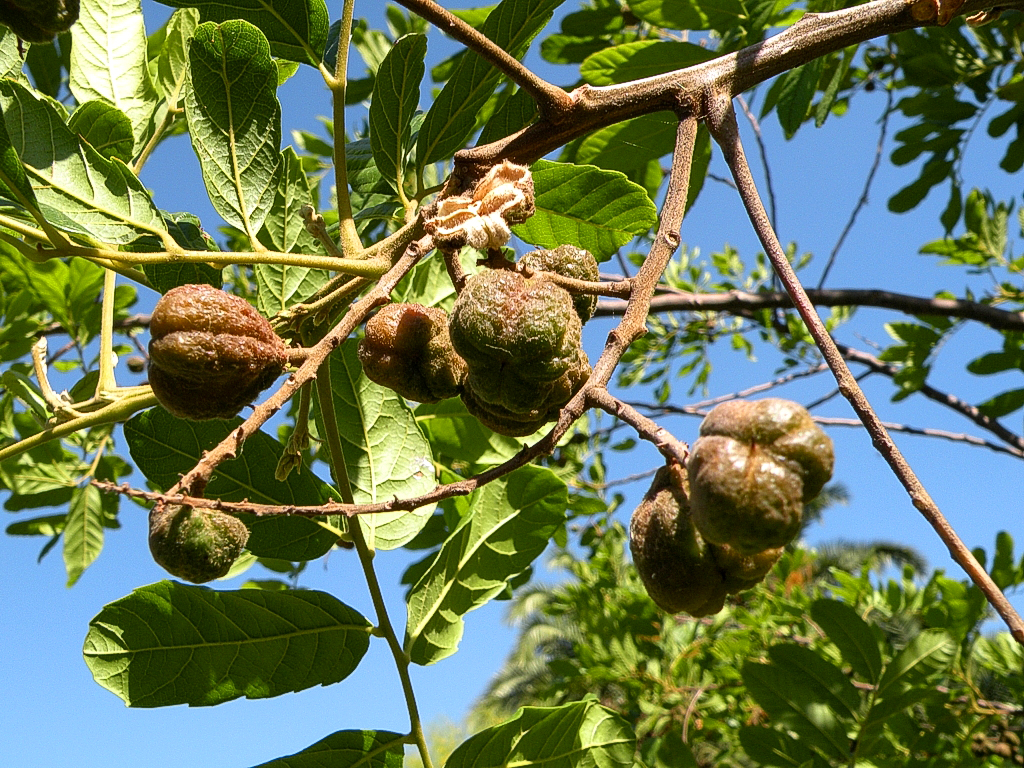
- Camboatá (Cupania vernalis)

Scientific classification
- Kingdom: Plantae
- Clade: Tracheophytes
- Clade: Angiosperms
- Clade: Eudicots
- Clade: Rosids
- Order: Sapindales
- Family: Sapindaceae
- Genus: Cupania
- Species: C. vernalis

Binomial name
- Cupania vernalis Cambess.

= Cupania vernalis =

Species of flowering plant

Cupania vernalis is a tree species in the genus Cupania and family Sapindaceae. They have a self-supporting growth form. They are native to Sao Paulo.

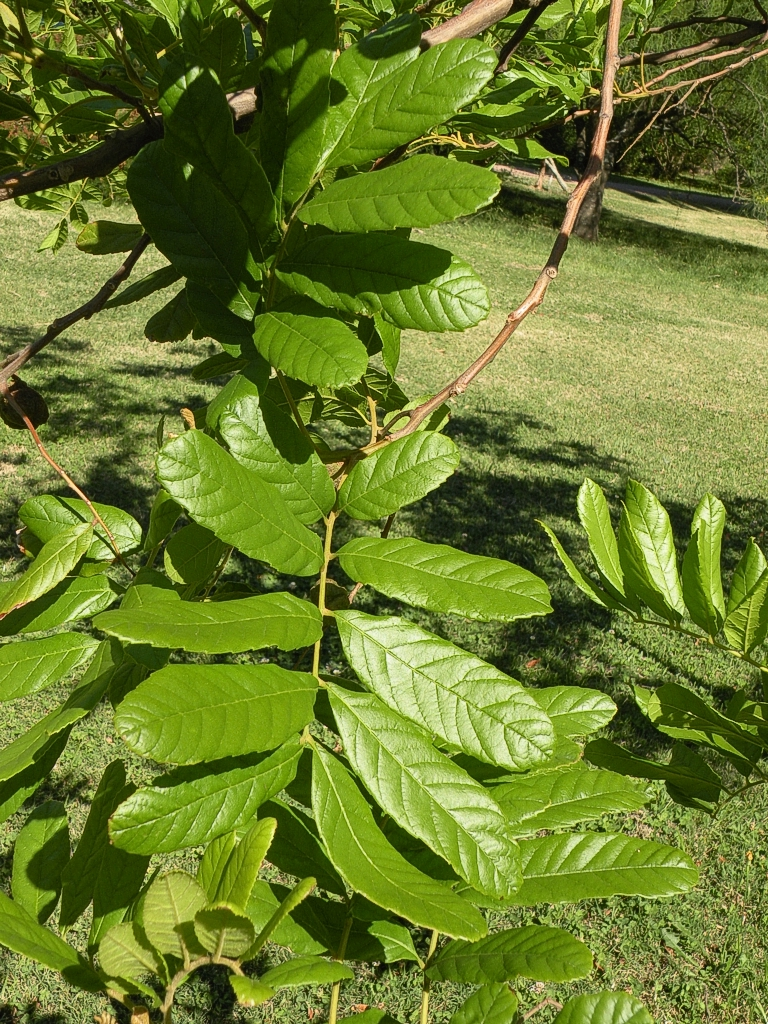
Camboatá (Cupania vernalis)
