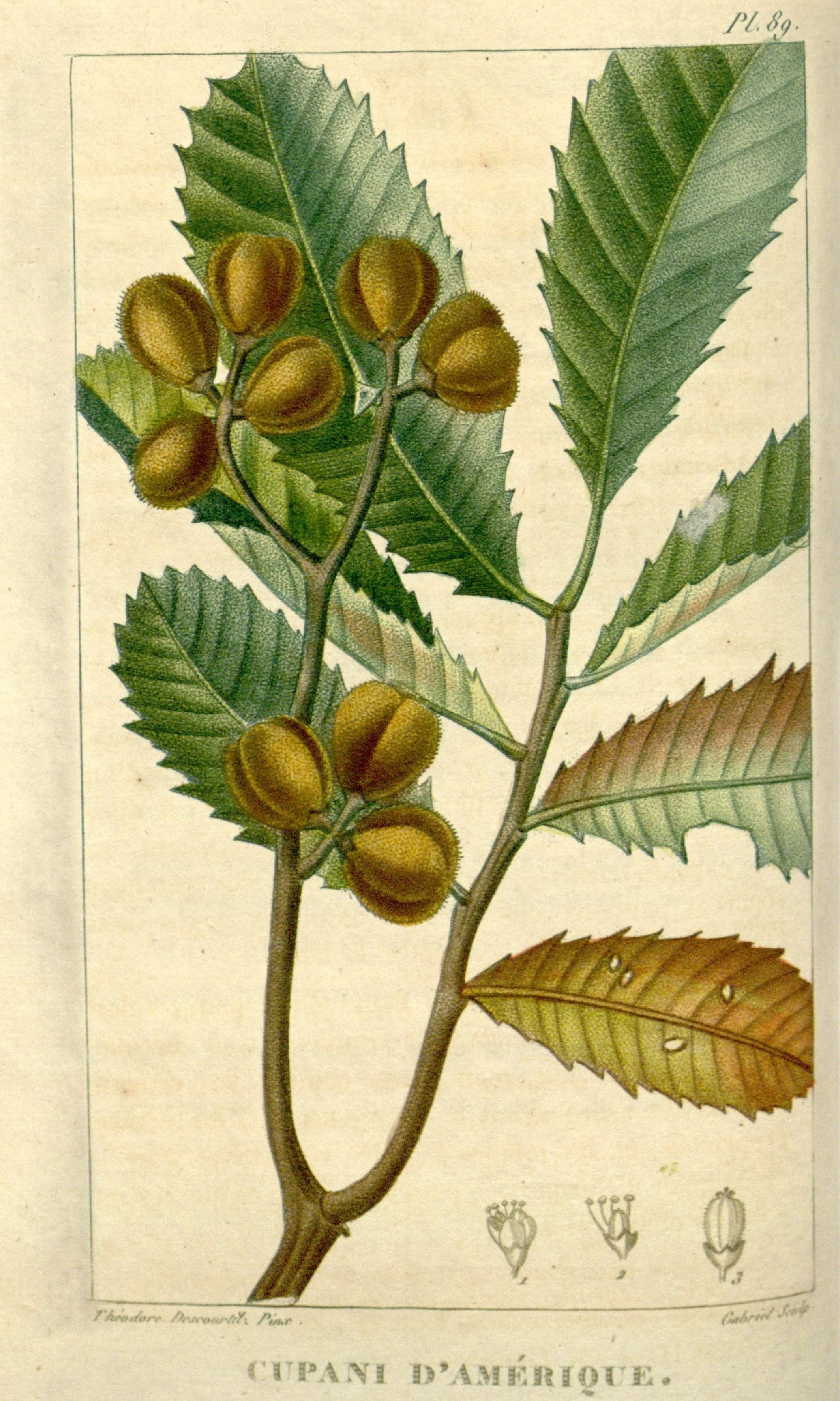

Conservation status
- Least Concern (IUCN 3.1)

Scientific classification
- Kingdom: Plantae
- Clade: Embryophytes
- Clade: Tracheophytes
- Clade: Angiosperms
- Clade: Eudicots
- Clade: Rosids
- Order: Sapindales
- Family: Sapindaceae
- Genus: Cupania
- Species: C. americana

Binomial name
- Cupania americana L.

= Cupania americana =

Species of tree

Cupania americana, commonly known as guara, is a species of tree in the family of Sapindaceae which grows in moist tropical areas of Central and South America. It has traditional uses for food and medicine.
