= Chiodecton complexum =

Scientific classification
- Kingdom: Fungi
- Division: Ascomycota
- Class: Arthoniomycetes
- Order: Arthoniales
- Family: Roccellaceae
- Genus: Chiodecton
- Species: C. complexum

Binomial name
- Chiodecton complexum Aptroot & M.Cáceres (2014)
- Holotype: Federal University of Rondônia campus, Brazil

Species of lichen

Chiodecton complexum is a species of corticolous (bark-dwelling) crustose lichen in the family Roccellaceae. Described from Brazil in 2014, this lichen has since been found across multiple Brazilian states from the Amazon to the Atlantic coast, as well as in Panama. The species forms a greenish-gray crusty growth on tree bark and produces both powdery patches called soredia for asexual reproduction and immersed fruiting structures arranged in branched lines for sexual reproduction. It can be found growing on smooth bark in lowland rainforests, including both native trees in primary forest and cultivated rubber trees in plantation settings.

== Taxonomy ==
Chiodecton complexum was introduced in 2014 by André Aptroot and Marcela Cáceres. The type material was collected by the authors on smooth tree bark at the Federal University of Rondônia campus south of Porto Velho, (Rondônia Brazil), at an elevation of roughly 100 m (330 ft).

The authors diagnosed it as a corticolous (bark-dwelling) species of Chiodecton with discrete soralia and apothecia that are immersed and arranged in branched lines within small stromata; the spores are hyaline and three-septate.

Within the genus, it differs from C. pustuliferum (the only other sorediate species then known) by lacking that species' paler, much thicker thallus and black, fibrous (byssoid) border, and from the Australasian C. leptosporum by having soredia, apothecia clustered in lines rather than evenly dispersed, and longer conidia.

== Description ==
The thallus (lichen body) forms a continuous crust up to about 5 cm (2 in) across, closely attached to the bark and smooth to slightly felty, greenish-gray with a pinkish tint when fresh, and edged by a narrow, dark-brown prothallus (a felted boundary). Soralia are small, rounded, powdery patches that shed soredia (tiny clumps of algal cells wrapped in fungal threads for asexual spread). In C. complexum, they are numerous, mostly central, 0.2–0.6 mm across, and may coalesce but remain individually recognisable; the soredia are pale green and the pinkish hue fades in the herbarium.

Sexual structures are immersed: the apothecia sit within small stromata (cushions) 0.5–2.5 mm wide that contain strings of many tiny ascomata; from above, only minute black ostioles (pin-prick openings) are visible. Internally, the fruiting body wall is darkened (carbonized), the hymenium is amyloid (stains blue in iodine), and the asci produce eight, narrowly spindle-shaped, 3-septate ascospores with pointed ends.

Asexual fruiting bodies (pycnidia) are frequent near the thallus margin; they are black dots about 0.1 mm across, and they release very slender, curved conidia 13–18 × 1 μm. Standard chemical spot tests are negative and thin-layer chromatography detected only trace roccellic acid.

== Habitat and distribution ==
Chiodecton complexum grows on smooth bark in or near lowland rainforest. It is confirmed from Brazil, with original collections from Rondônia (including primary forest at the Parque Natural Municipal de Porto Velho and an urban park) and from Ceará (Chapada do Araripe). It occurs on native trees and also on Hevea brasiliensis (rubber) in plantation settings. It has since been widely recorded in Brazil, including the states of Amapá, Amazonas, Bahia, Ceará, Mato Grosso, Santa Catarina, and Sergipe. It has also been found in Panama's Veraguas Province.
