= Astrothelium ochroleucoides =

Scientific classification
- Kingdom: Fungi
- Division: Ascomycota
- Class: Dothideomycetes
- Order: Trypetheliales
- Family: Trypetheliaceae
- Genus: Astrothelium
- Species: A. ochroleucoides

Binomial name
- Astrothelium ochroleucoides Aptroot & M.Cáceres (2016)

Species of lichen-forming fungus

Astrothelium ochroleucoides is a species of corticolous (bark-dwelling) lichen in the family Trypetheliaceae. It is found in Brazil and Guyana.

== Taxonomy ==
Astrothelium ochroleucoides was first described in 2016 by lichenologists André Aptroot and Marcela Cáceres. The type specimen was collected from Estação Ecológica de Cuniã (near Porto Velho, Rondônia), where it was growing on tree bark in primary rainforest. It is most similar to Astrothelium corallinum; the main difference between the two species is the presence of lichexanthone on the thallus and pseudostromata in Astrothelium ochroleucoides.

== Description ==
The thallus of Astrothelium ochroleucoides is corticate, smooth, somewhat shiny, and continuous, covering areas up to 8 cm (3.1 in) in diameter. It is olive-green, approximately 0.1 mm thick, and surrounded by a black prothallus line about 0.3 mm wide. This species does not induce gall formation on the host bark.

Ascomata are spherical, measuring 0.4–0.6 mm in diameter, and immersed in groups of approximately 2–40 in pseudostromata. Pseudostromata have a surface different from the thallus, raised about 0.5–1.0 mm above the thallus, and are oval to irregular or reticulate in outline, up to about 3 mm wide. They are brownish-black, usually partly with a whitish cover, partly brownish, and partly whitish inside. The wall is dark brown all around, with a thickness of up to about 40 μm. Ostioles are apical, not fused, flat to convex, and brown. The hamathecium is not inspersed with oil globules. Asci contain four ascospores, which are hyaline, muriform, fusiform, and measure 80–115 by 15–24 μm, with an upper end rounded, lower end pointed, and angular lumina with only a few transverse, mostly oblique septa.

Pycnidia were not observed in this species. In terms of chemical spot tests, the thallus surface is UV+ (yellow), and the thallus medulla is K−. The whitish parts of the pseudostroma surface are UV+ (yellow) and K−, while the pseudostroma medulla is also K−. Thin-layer chromatography reveals the presence of lichexanthone in the thallus and on the pseudostroma.

== Habitat and distribution ==
Astrothelium ochroleucoides is found on twigs or bark of tree trunks in primary forests, parks, and savannahs. It is known from Brazil and Guyana, where it is locally abundant.

== See also ==
- List of lichens of Brazil
