= Chiodecton leprarioides =

Scientific classification
- Domain: Eukaryota
- Kingdom: Fungi
- Division: Ascomycota
- Class: Arthoniomycetes
- Order: Arthoniales
- Family: Roccellaceae
- Genus: Chiodecton
- Species: C. leprarioides

Binomial name
- Chiodecton leprarioides Kalb & Aptroot (2021)

Species of lichen

Chiodecton leprarioides is a species of lichen in the family Roccellaceae. Found in Réunion, it was described as a new species in 2021 by the lichenologists Klaus Kalb and André Aptroot. The type was collected in the Cirque de Cilaos, on the climb towards the Col du Taïbit, at an elevation of about 1,300 m (4,300 ft). Here it was found growing on tree bark in a secondary scrub forest. The specific epithet leprarioides refers to the farinose (mealy) soredia that cover the lichen thallus.

== Description ==
Chiodecton leprarioides forms a dull, pale-ochre crust on bark, between about 0.2 and 0.8 mm thick. The surface soon becomes almost completely dusted with farinose soredia—powder-fine bundles of fungal and algal cells that act as ready-made propagules—so the underlying thallus is often hidden. These soredia range from pale ochre to light brown and may darken in patches, giving the crust a speckled appearance. Around the margin the lichen produces a conspicuous chocolate-brown fringe of loose hyphae up to 2 mm wide (the prothallus). The photosynthetic partner is a filamentous green alga of the genus Trentepohlia, which lends an orange tint to freshly exposed tissue.

Reproductive bodies (ascomata) develop within pale to mid-brown stromata—small cushion-like mats of fungal tissue that sit on the thallus and measure 1–4 mm across. Each stroma contains dozens of minute, almost spherical ascomata sunk beneath the surface; in the field these are revealed only by pinpoint black pores (ostioles) arranged in irregular lines. Internally, the spore-bearing layer (hymenium) is about 100 μm high and turns deep blue in iodine (IKI ⁺), a reaction that helps confirm the species. The asci release eight colourless ascospores that are slightly curved, five-septate and 48–52 × 3.5–4.5 μm. No asexual pycnidia have been observed. Spot tests are negative and thin-layer chromatography detects no secondary metabolites, indicating that the lichen lacks the typical lichen products found in many relatives.
