= Penicillium persicinum =

Scientific classification
- Domain: Eukaryota
- Kingdom: Fungi
- Division: Ascomycota
- Class: Eurotiomycetes
- Order: Eurotiales
- Family: Aspergillaceae
- Genus: Penicillium
- Species: P. persicinum

Binomial name
- Penicillium persicinum L. Wang, H.B. Zhou, Frisvad & Samson 2004

Type strain
- CBS 111235

Species of fungus

Penicillium persicinum is a species of fungus in the genus Penicillium which was isolated from soil from the Qinghai Province in China. Penicillium persicinum produces griseofulvin, lichexanthone, roquefortine C, roquefortine D, patulin and chrysogine
