= Crypthonia divaricatica =

Scientific classification
- Kingdom: Fungi
- Division: Ascomycota
- Class: Arthoniomycetes
- Order: Arthoniales
- Family: Arthoniaceae
- Genus: Crypthonia
- Species: C. divaricatica

Binomial name
- Crypthonia divaricatica Aptroot & Sipman (2014)
- Holotype: Lagunas de Montebello National Park, Mexico

Species of lichen

Crypthonia divaricatica is a species of corticolous (bark-dwelling), crustose lichen in the family Arthoniaceae. It is only known to occur in its type locality in Mexico, where it grows on oak in mountainous forests.

== Taxonomy ==
Crypthonia divaricatica was described as a new species in 2014 by the Dutch lichenologists André Aptroot and Harrie Sipman. The type specimen was collected in Mexico, in the state of Chiapas, within Lagunas de Montebello National Park at Paso del Soldado. It was found growing on the bark of Quercus sapotifolia at an elevation of 1,500 m (4,900 ft). The specimen was gathered on 29 November 1994 by J. Wolf and Sipman (collection number 2124). The holotype is deposited at the Berlin Herbarium (B). The species epithet divaricatica alludes to the presence of divaricatic acid, a characteristic secondary metabolite found in this lichen.

== Description ==
Crypthonia divaricatica is a crustose lichen with a continuous, non-corticate thallus that has a pale mineral-greenish colouration. Its thallus is relatively thin, measuring about 0.3–0.5 mm in thickness, and is composed of loosely arranged, fluffy granules about 0.2 mm in diameter. Its surface is highly irregular and rests on a continuous to somewhat filamentous white hypothallus, which extends outward as a white prothallus. The lichen contains trentepohlioid algae, a type of green alga known for its orange to reddish pigments due to the presence of carotenoids.

The reproductive structures of C. divaricatica are rounded and flat, appearing whitish and not rising above the surface of the thallus. These structures range from 1.0 to 1.6 mm in diameter and are 0.2–0.5 mm high. Inside, the interascal tissue consists of a network of interconnected, thread-like paraphysoids that turn blue when stained with iodine (IKI+). The asci, which contain the spores, are abundant, transparent, and pear-shaped, measuring 45–73 by 35–50 μm, with a thickened upper wall of about 10 μm. Each ascus holds eight ascospores, which are hyaline (colourless), broadly club-shaped, and divided by 5 to 9 septa. These spores are relatively large, measuring 20–27 by 95–125 μm. The uppermost cell is the largest (macrocephalic), while the lowermost cell is also slightly enlarged compared to the intermediate cells. No pycnidia, the asexual reproductive structures, have been observed in this species.

Chemical analysis of C. divaricatica reveals the presence of divaricatic acid and usnic acid. When exposed to ultraviolet (UV) light, both the thallus and the reproductive structures fluoresce white, while standard chemical spot tests (C, P, and K) yield negative results.
