= Crypthonia corticorygmoides =

Scientific classification
- Kingdom: Fungi
- Division: Ascomycota
- Class: Arthoniomycetes
- Order: Arthoniales
- Family: Arthoniaceae
- Genus: Crypthonia
- Species: C. corticorygmoides

Binomial name
- Crypthonia corticorygmoides Aptroot & M.Cáceres (2016)
- Holotype: Amapá National Forest, Brazil

Species of lichen

Crypthonia corticorygmoides is a species of corticolous (bark-dwelling) crustose lichen in the family Arthoniaceae. This lichen was discovered growing on tree bark in the primary rainforest of Brazil's Amapá National Forest, and described as a new species in 2016. It is distinctive for having unusually large, white, stroma-like ascospore-producing areas that develop deep cracks when dry, giving it a unique appearance among related species.

== Taxonomy ==
Crypthonia corticorygmoides was described as new to science in 2016 by André Aptroot and Marcela da Silva Cáceres, from material collected in the Amapá National Forest (eastern Brazilian Amazon). The holotype was gathered on tree bark in primary tall forest at about 30 m elevation. The specific epithet refers to the resemblance of its ascigerous (spore-producing) areas to those of certain stromatoid Graphidaceae.

In their notes, the authors pointed out that the species otherwise matches Crypthonia in thallus, ascoma structure, and asci, but is distinctive within the genus for having 3–5-septate spores and unusually large, stromatoid ascigerous areas; they also remarked on a superficial resemblance to Sclerophyton and to Acanthothecis sarcographoides.

== Description ==
The thallus is 0.2–0.5 mm thick, dull and felty, olive green with occasional bleached spots, over a white medulla, and bordered by an roughly 1 mm wide white hyphal prothallus. The photobiont is trentepohlioid (cells about 6–9 μm). The ascigerous areas are irregular, white, stromatoid (stroma-like), 2.5–15 mm in diameter and to about 0.3 mm high, with a dense pattern of deep fissures when dry; pale brown asci are visible from the surface. Interascal tissue consists of much-branched, anastomosing hyphae. Asci (8-spored) are clavate, 55–85 × 17–20 μm, thick-walled. Ascospores are hyaline, clavate, 3–5-septate, 25–29 × 5–6 μm (rounded above, pointed below). Pycnidia were not observed. In terms of chemistry, the thallus is UV−, C−, P−, K−; thin-layer chromatography detected no lichen substances.

== Habitat and distribution ==
The species grows on tree bark in primary tall forest in the eastern Amazon and is known only from Brazil. In addition to Amapá, Crypthonia corticorygmoides has been documented from the states of Amazonas and Pará.
