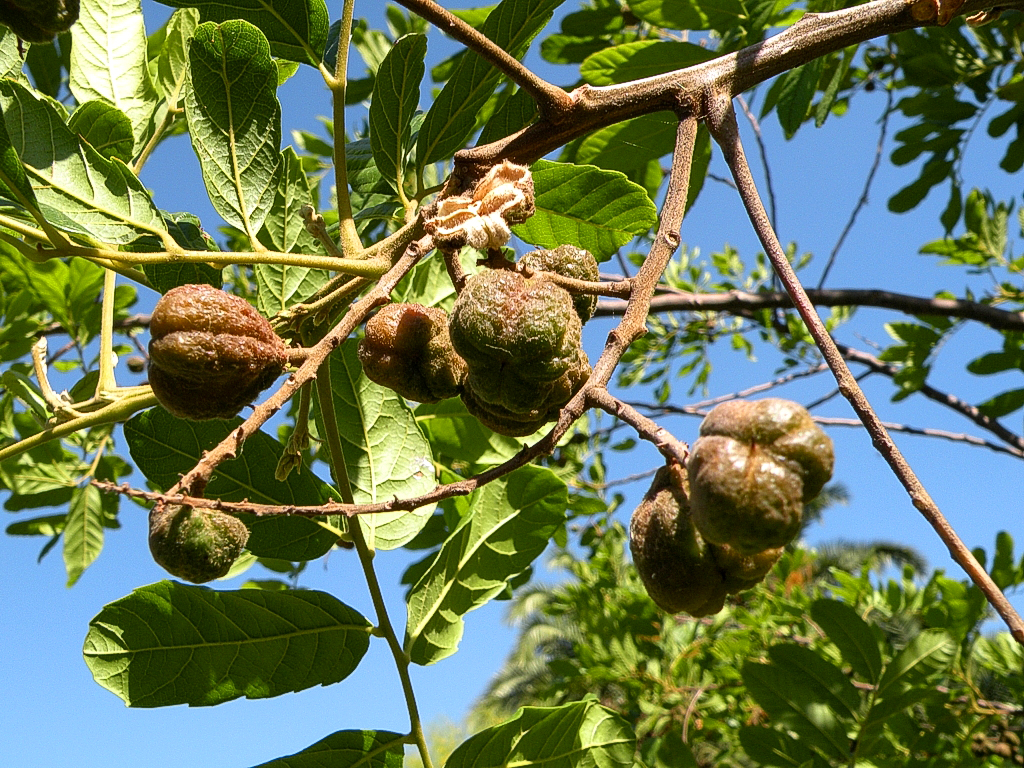
- Camboatá (Cupania vernalis)

Scientific classification
- Kingdom: Plantae
- Clade: Embryophytes
- Clade: Tracheophytes
- Clade: Spermatophytes
- Clade: Angiosperms
- Clade: Eudicots
- Clade: Rosids
- Order: Sapindales
- Family: Sapindaceae
- Tribe: Cupanieae
- Genus: Cupania; L., 1753

Species
- 58; see text

Synonyms
- Digonocarpus Vell. (1829); Trigonis Jacq. (1760); Trigonocarpus Vell. (1829); Tripha Noronha (1790), nom. nud.

= Cupania =

Genus of flowering plants

Cupania is a genus of flowering plants in the family Sapindaceae. It includes 58 species native to the tropical Americas, ranging from Mexico and south Florida through Central America, the Caribbean, and South America to northern Argentina.

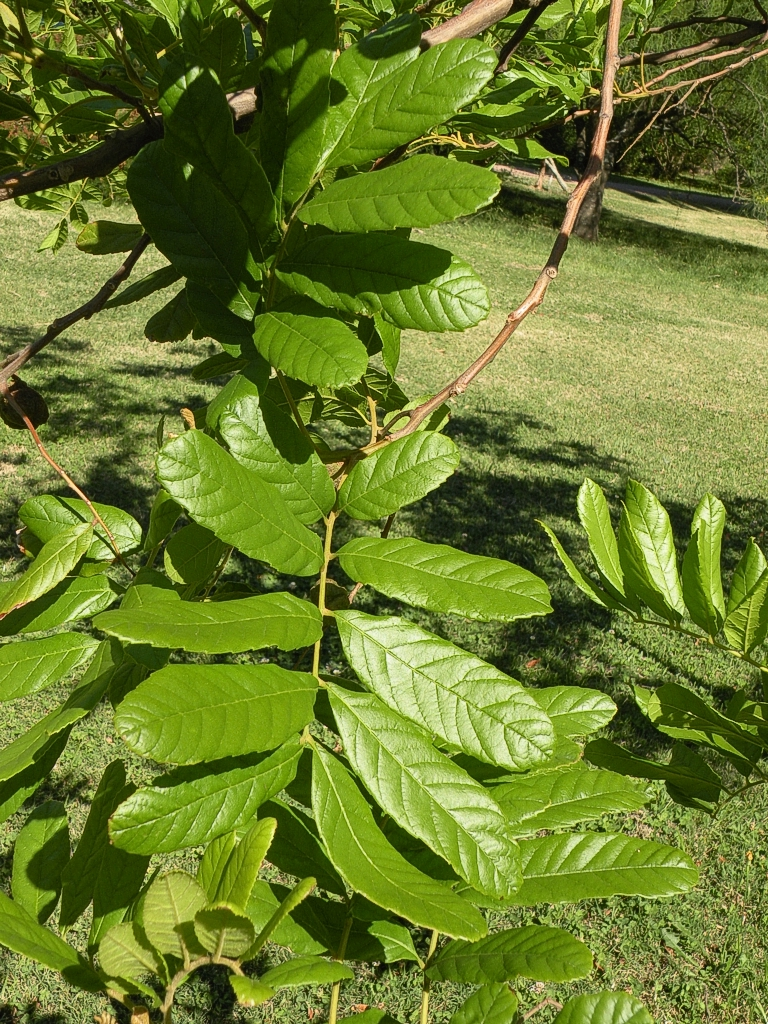
Camboatá (Cupania vernalis)

== Species ==
58 species are accepted:

- Cupania americana L.
- Cupania belizensis Standl.
- Cupania bracteosa Radlk.
- Cupania castaneifolia Mart.
- Cupania cinerea Poepp.
- Cupania clavelligera Lundell
- Cupania concolor Radlk.
- Cupania congestiflora Cuatrec.
- Cupania crassifolia Radlk.
- Cupania dentata Moc. & Sessé ex DC.
- Cupania diphylla Vahl
- Cupania dukei Croat
- Cupania emarginata Cambess.
- Cupania fluminensis Acev.-Rodr.
- Cupania furfuracea Radlk.
- Cupania glabra Sw.
- Cupania grandiflora J.F.Morales
- Cupania guatemalensis (Turcz.) Radlk.
- Cupania hirsuta Radlk.
- Cupania hispida Radlk.
- Cupania impressinervia Acev.-Rodr.
- Cupania inaequilatera Guarim
- Cupania juglandifolia A.Rich.
- Cupania kukenanica Steyerm.
- Cupania largifolia Radlk.
- Cupania latifolia Kunth
- Cupania liberiana Guarim
- Cupania livida (Radlk.) Croat
- Cupania longicaudata Lundell
- Cupania ludowigii Somner & Ferrucci
- Cupania macrostylis (Radlk.) Acev.-Rodr.
- Cupania mayana Lundell
- Cupania mollis Standl.
- Cupania moraesiana Guarim
- Cupania moralesii J.E.Jiménez, P.Juárez & J.M.Chaves
- Cupania oblongifolia Mart.
- Cupania olivacea Gleason & A.C.Sm.
- Cupania paniculata Cambess.
- Cupania platycarpa Radlk.
- Cupania polyodonta Radlk.
- Cupania polyzyga Radlk.
- Cupania quepoarum Chinchilla
- Cupania racemosa (Vell.) Radlk.
- Cupania radlkoferi Acev.-Rodr.
- Cupania rigida Radlk.
- Cupania riopalenquensis Dodson & A.H.Gentry
- Cupania rubiginosa (Poir.) Radlk.
- Cupania rufescens Triana & Planch.
- Cupania rugosa Radlk.
- Cupania schizoneura Radlk.
- Cupania scrobiculata Rich.
- Cupania seemannii Triana & Planch.
- Cupania semiglabra Cuatrec.
- Cupania spectabilis Radlk.
- Cupania tenuivalvis Radlk.
- Cupania triquetra A.Rich.
- Cupania vernalis Cambess.
- Cupania zanthoxyloides Cambess.

horticultural names

- Cupania elegans L.Linden., 1893
