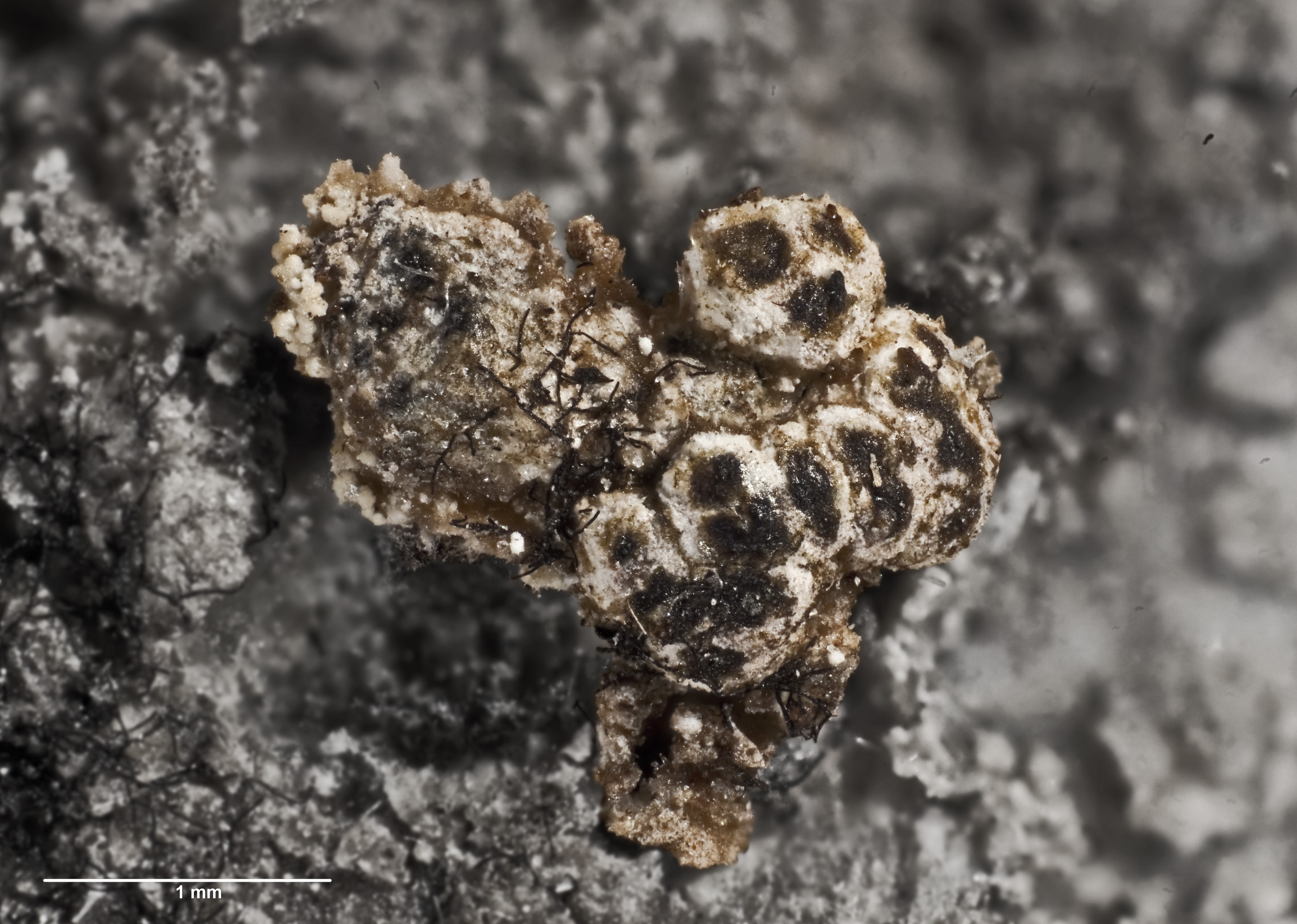
- Chiodecton montanum

Scientific classification
- Domain: Eukaryota
- Kingdom: Fungi
- Division: Ascomycota
- Class: Arthoniomycetes
- Order: Arthoniales
- Family: Roccellaceae
- Genus: Chiodecton; Ach. (1814)

Type species
- Chiodecton sphaerale Ach. (1814)

Species
- See text

Synonyms
- Melanodecton A.Massal. (1860)

= Chiodecton =

Genus of lichens

Chiodecton is a genus of lichens in the family Roccellaceae. The genus was circumscribed by the lichenologist Erik Acharius in 1814, with Chiodecton sphaerale assigned as the type species.

== Species ==
As of September 2024, Species Fungorum (in the Catalogue of Life) accepts 24 species in Chiodecton.

- Chiodecton acarosporoides C.W.Dodge (1970)
- Chiodecton andamanicum Jagad.Ram (2014) – India
- Chiodecton applanatum G.Thor (2007) – Malaysia
- Chiodecton colensoi (A.Massal.) Müll.Arg. (1894)
- Chiodecton complexum Aptroot & M.Cáceres (2014) – Brazil
- Chiodecton congestulum Nyl. (1868)
- Chiodecton effusum Fée (1825)
- Chiodecton flavovirens G.Thor (1991)
- Chiodecton graphidastroides Kalb & Aptroot (2018)
- Chiodecton heterogenum (C.Knight) Zahlbr. (1923)
- Chiodecton leprarioides Kalb & Aptroot (2021) – Réunion
- Chiodecton leptosporum Müll.Arg. (1882)
- Chiodecton lichexanthonicum M.Cáceres & Aptroot (2017) – Brazil
- Chiodecton macquariense C.W.Dodge (1970)
- Chiodecton maculatum (C.Knight) Zahlbr. (1923)
- Chiodecton montanum G.Thor (1991)
- Chiodecton norsticticum Jagad.Ram (2016) – India
- Chiodecton pustuliferum Aptroot (2011)
- Chiodecton queenslandiae G.Thor (1991)
- Chiodecton sorediatum G.Thor & Frisch (2013) – Uganda
- Chiodecton sphaerale Ach. (1814)
- Chiodecton stictathecium (C.Knight) Zahlbr. (1923)
- Chiodecton sublaevigatum Kremp. (1881)
- Chiodecton subordinatum Nyl. (1867)
- Chiodecton xanthonosorediatum Aptroot (2020)
