= Penicillium concentricum =

Scientific classification
- Kingdom: Fungi
- Division: Ascomycota
- Class: Eurotiomycetes
- Order: Eurotiales
- Family: Aspergillaceae
- Genus: Penicillium
- Species: P. concentricum

Binomial name
- Penicillium concentricum Samson, Stolk & Hadlok 1976

Type strain
- ATCC 48954, CBS 477.75, CGMCC 3.7895, FRR 1715, IBT 14571, IBT 6577, MUCL 39546]

Synonyms
- Penicillium glandicola var. glaucovenetum

Species of fungus

Penicillium concentricum is a coprophilic, anamorph fungus species of the genus of Penicillium which produces roquefortine C and patulin.

== See also ==
- List of Penicillium species
