= Chiodecton lichexanthonicum =

Scientific classification
- Domain: Eukaryota
- Kingdom: Fungi
- Division: Ascomycota
- Class: Arthoniomycetes
- Order: Arthoniales
- Family: Roccellaceae
- Genus: Chiodecton
- Species: C. lichexanthonicum

Binomial name
- Chiodecton lichexanthonicum M.Cáceres & Aptroot (2017)

Species of lichen

Chiodecton lichexanthonicum is a species of crustose and corticolous (bark-dwelling) lichen in the family Roccellaceae. Found in the Brazilian Amazon, it was formally described as a new species in 2017 by lichenologists Marcela Eugenia da Silva Cáceres and André Aptroot. The type was collected by the authors from the Adolfo Ducke Forest Reserve (Manaus, Amazonas), along trails near a field station; here, in old-growth rainforest, it was found growing on tree bark. The specific epithet lichexanthonicum refers to its major cortical compound, lichexanthone. It is the first species in genus Chiodecton known to contain this compound. Chiodecton lichexanthonicum has narrow, club-shaped ascospores with seven septa that measure 30–34 by 2.5–3.5 μm.
