= Chiodecton pustuliferum =

Scientific classification
- Kingdom: Fungi
- Division: Ascomycota
- Class: Arthoniomycetes
- Order: Arthoniales
- Family: Roccellaceae
- Genus: Chiodecton
- Species: C. pustuliferum

Binomial name
- Chiodecton pustuliferum Aptroot (2011)

Species of lichen

Chiodecton pustuliferum is a little-known species of lichen in the family Roccellaceae. Found in Madagascar, it was described as new to science in 2011. This lichen is unique among its relatives for developing distinctive white dome-shaped pustules that break open to release powdery reproductive structures (soredia). It inhabits the bark of trees in Madagascar's humid mountain forests and is known only from specimens collected in the Andasibe region.

== Taxonomy ==
Chiodecton pustuliferum was formally described in 2011 by André Aptroot, who based the name on specimens he and Aino Henssen had collected in 1984 in the Andasibe region of eastern Madagascar. Although the material is completely sterile—no ascomata or pycnidia have been observed—the combination of a dull, crustose thallus seated on a brown, cobweb-like (arachnoid) hypothallus and the presence of roccellic acid supports its placement in the genus Chiodecton (family Roccellaceae).

The new lichen differs from all other previously known members of Chiodecton, and also from other members of the order Arthoniales, in producing conspicuous pustules. These erupt through the thallus as discrete, white swellings and inspired the specific epithet pustuliferum ("bearing pustules").

== Description ==
The lichen forms a bark-dwelling (corticolous) crust up to about 7 cm across. Its surface consists of scalloped (crenate), irregular areoles 0.4–4 mm in diameter that are pale brown at the margins and whiter towards the centre. The entire thallus rests on a continuous, brown arachnoid hypothallus whose interwoven filaments are 2–3 micrometres (μm) wide and in places are roughened by crystal deposits; this hypothallus also outlines the thallus with a narrow, darker border up to 1 mm wide.

Pustules are numerous in C. pustuliferum, erumpent, up to 3 mm across and about 1 mm tall; they remain mostly separate and appear as white domes contrasting with the thallus. Each pustule breaks open to expose a mass of powdery soredia—granular propagules 100–200 μm across—that disseminate the lichen. Microscopy shows that the soredia contain the same trentepohlioid algal partner (cells measuring about 10 × 15 μm) found in the thallus and are bound by branched, crystal-encrusted fungal hyphae. No sexual or asexual fruit-bodies have been detected, and thin-layer chromatography reveals only one secondary metabolite, roccellic acid.

== Habitat and distribution ==
As of its original publication, Chiodecton pustuliferum was known solely from its type locality: primary montane rainforest at about 950 m elevation in the Andasibe area of Madagascar's eastern escarpment. The lichen grows on the bark of trees in this humid, mid-elevation tropical forest, and no other populations have yet been reported. It is one of three Chiodecton species that have been reported from Madagascar; the others are C. natalense and C. papillosum.
