= Crypthonia =

Scientific classification
- Kingdom: Fungi
- Division: Ascomycota
- Class: Arthoniomycetes
- Order: Arthoniales
- Family: Arthoniaceae
- Genus: Crypthonia; Frisch & G.Thor (2010)

Type species
- Crypthonia polillensis (Vain.) Frisch & G.Thor (2010)

Genus of lichens

Crypthonia is a genus of lichen-forming fungi in the family Arthoniaceae. It has 16 species. The genus was circumscribed in 2010 by Andreas Frisch and Göran Thor, with Crypthonia polillensis assigned as the type species.

== Species ==
As of July 2024, Species Fungorum (in the Catalogue of Life) accepts 16 species of Crypthonia, but this does not yet account for three new species described from Brazil in 2024.

- Crypthonia albida (Fée) Frisch & G.Thor (2010)
- Crypthonia athertonensis Frisch & G.Thor (2010)
- Crypthonia bella Frisch & G.Thor (2010)
- Crypthonia biseptata (Aptroot & Wolseley) Frisch & G.Thor (2010)
- Crypthonia brevispora Frisch & G.Thor (2010)
- Crypthonia citrina Frisch & G.Thor (2010)
- Crypthonia corticorygmoides Aptroot & M.Cáceres (2016)
- Crypthonia divaricatica Aptroot & Sipman (2014)
- Crypthonia irregularis Aptroot, L.A.Santos & M.Cáceres (2024) – Brazil
- Crypthonia lichexanthonica A.A.Menezes, M.Cáceres & Aptroot (2013) – Brazil
- Crypthonia mycelioides (Vain.) Frisch & G.Thor (2010)
- Crypthonia olivacea Frisch & G.Thor (2010)
- Crypthonia palaeotropica Frisch & G.Thor (2010)
- Crypthonia polillensis (Vain.) Frisch & G.Thor (2010)
- Crypthonia pseudisidiata Aptroot, L.A.Santos & M.Cáceres (2024) – Brazil
- Crypthonia streimannii Sipman (2018)
- Crypthonia stromatica Aptroot, L.A.Santos & M.Cáceres (2024) – Brazil
- Crypthonia submuriformis M.Cáceres & Aptroot (2013) – Brazil
- Crypthonia vandenboomii Frisch & G.Thor (2010)
