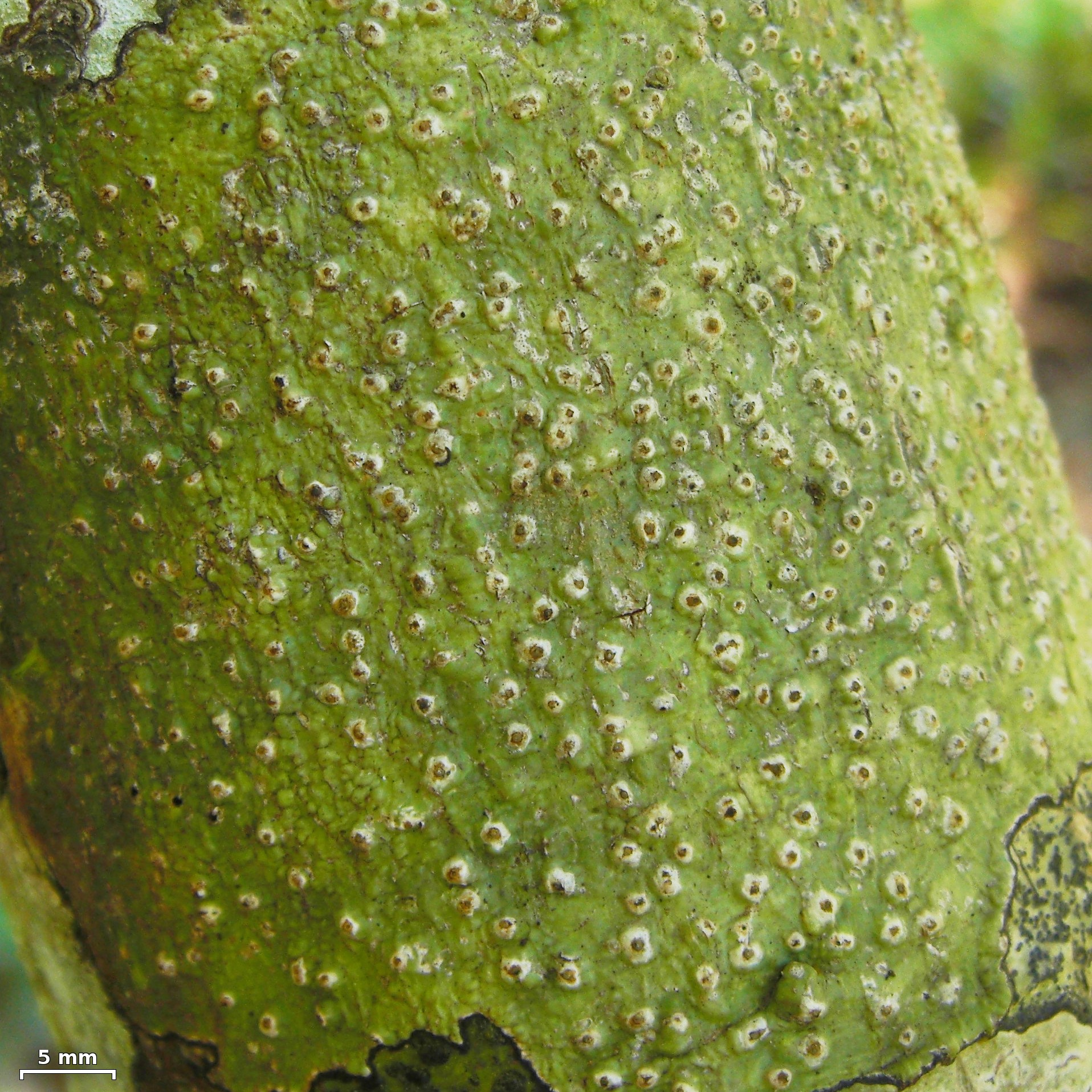
- unidentified Laurera species

Scientific classification
- Kingdom: Fungi
- Division: Ascomycota
- Class: Dothideomycetes
- Order: Trypetheliales
- Family: Trypetheliaceae
- Genus: Laurera; Rchb. (1841)

Type species
- Laurera varia (Fée) Zahlbr. (1841)

Synonyms
- Meissneria Fée (1837); Cryptothelium A.Massal. (1860); Meristosporum A.Massal. (1860); Bathelium Trevis. (1861); Heufleria Trevis. (1861); Riddlea C.W.Dodge (1953)

= Laurera =

Genus of lichen-forming fungi

Laurera is a genus of lichen-forming fungi in the family Trypetheliaceae.

== Taxonomy ==
The genus was circumscribed by Carl Ludwig von Reichenbach in 1841.

Laurera was traditionally separated from other corticate members of Trypetheliaceae mainly by its muriform (many-celled) ascospores and by ascomata (fruiting bodies) that open through separate, apical ostioles. More recent molecular work suggests that these morphological boundaries do not match evolutionary relationships across the family. Using a two-locus phylogeny (mtSSU and nrLSU) with broad sampling across Trypetheliaceae, Lücking and colleagues (2016) recovered species historically placed in Laurera within a wider, well-supported Astrothelium lineage, and treated Laurera as a synonym of Astrothelium (along with Cryptothelium and Campylothelium). Under this approach, most species once assigned to Laurera are placed in Astrothelium, while the former Laurera purpurina group is recognized in the separate genus Marcelaria.

== Species ==
- Laurera chrysocarpa (Müll.Arg.) Zahlbr. (1922)
- Laurera columellata Makhija & Patw. (1988)
- Laurera fusispora Makhija & Patw. (1988)
- Laurera monospora Breuss (1997)
- Laurera nigeriensis C.W.Dodge (1953)
- Laurera sepulta (Mont.) O.E.Erikss. (1981)
- Laurera submadreporiformis Abbayes (1953)
- Laurera subsphaerioides Makhija & Patw. (1988)
- Laurera varia (Fée) Zahlbr. (1903)
- Laurera verrucoaggregata Makhija & Patw. (1988)
