= Mount of Pai Inácio =

Mountain in Brazil

Pai Inácio
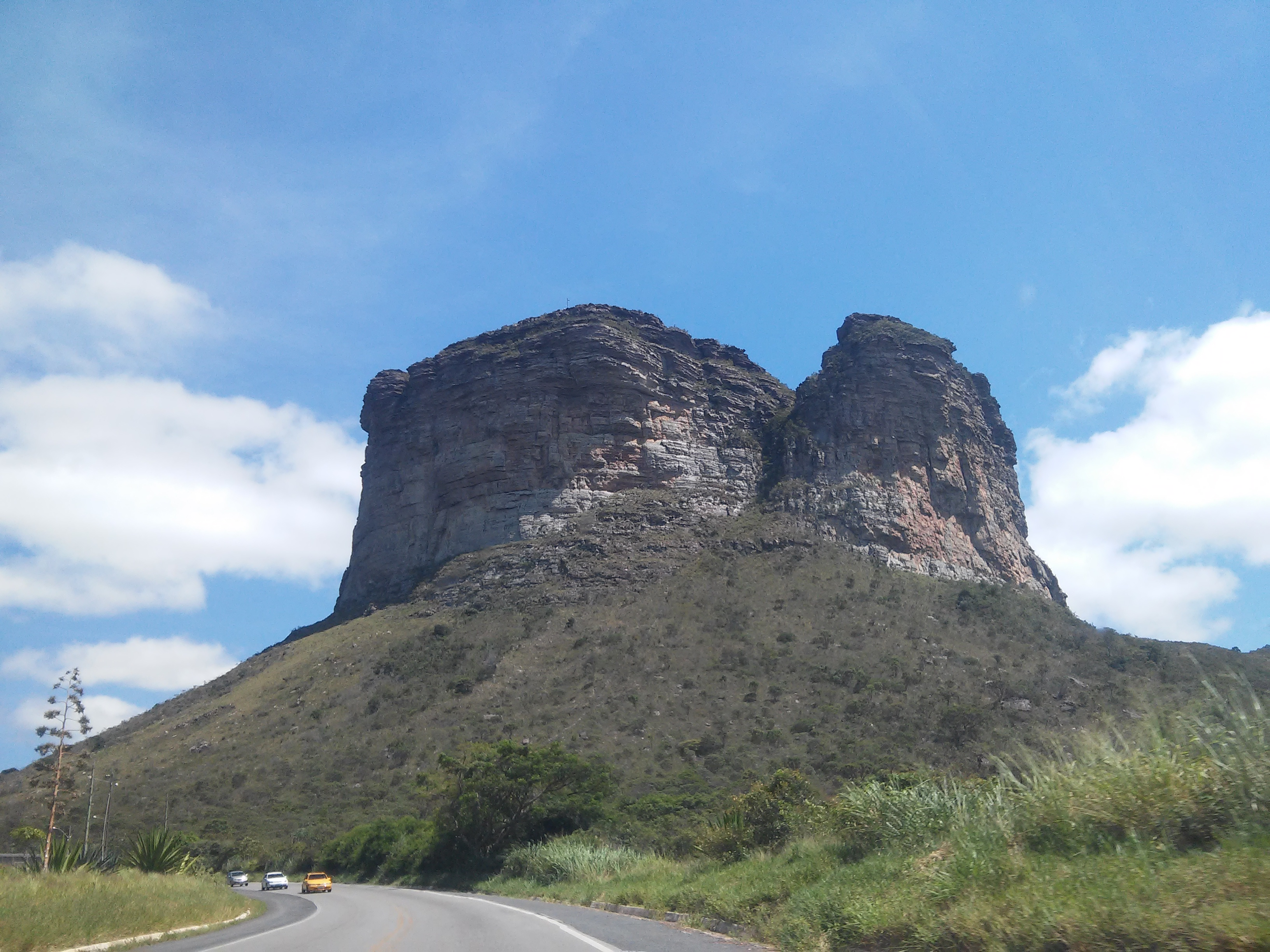

Highest point
- Elevation: 1,050 m (3,440 ft)
- Coordinates: 12°27′27″S 41°28′23″W

Geography
- Location within Brazil
- Location: Chapada Diamantina National Park

The Mount of Pai Inácio (Morro do Pai Inácio) is located in Chapada Diamantina National Park in Brazil. It belongs to the city of Palmeiras.

The mount is 1,120 metres high and exists at the coordinates 12º27º'27"S 41º28'23"W

== History ==
A slave had a romance with a daughter of a farmer, and she got pregnant. The fearful slave ran away and jumped with an open umbrella, disappearing forever.
