= Lichexanthone =

Chemical compound found in some lichens

Names
- IUPAC name 1-Hydroxy-3,6-dimethoxy-8-methyl-9H-xanthen-9-one
- Other names Lichenxanthone, 1-hydroxy-3,6-dimethoxy-8-methylxanthen-9-one

Identifiers
CAS Number	15222-53-4
3D model (JSmol)	Interactive image
ChEBI	CHEBI:67821
ChEMBL	ChEMBL470650
ChemSpider	4513972
PubChem CID	5358904
UNII	92O5D9Z07W
CompTox Dashboard (EPA)	DTXSID80164977
- InChI: InChI=1S/C16H14O5/c1-8-4-9(19-2)6-12-14(8)16(18)15-11(17)5-10(20-3)7-13(15)21-12/h4-7,17H,1-3H3 Key: QDLAGTHXVHQKRE-UHFFFAOYSA-N
- SMILES: CC1=CC(=CC2=C1C(=O)C3=C(C=C(C=C3O2)OC)O)OC

Properties
Chemical formula	C_{16}H_{14}O_{5}
Molar mass	286.283 g·mol^{−1}
Appearance	long yellow prismatic crystals
Density	1.323 g/cm^{3}
Melting point	189–190 °C (372–374 °F; 462–463 K)
Boiling point	494 °C (921 °F)

Structure
Crystal structure	Monoclinic
Space group	P2_{1}/c (No. 14)
Lattice constant	a = 11.6405 Å, b = 7.5444 Å, c = 15.2341 Å
Lattice volume (V)	1307.26 Å^{3}
Formula units (Z)	4

Hazards
Flash point	186.9 °C (368.4 °F)
- Except where otherwise noted, data are given for materials in their standard state (at 25 °C [77 °F], 100 kPa). verify (what is ?) Infobox references

Lichexanthone is an organic compound in the structural class of chemicals known as xanthones. Lichexanthone was first isolated and identified by Japanese chemists from a species of leafy lichen in the 1940s. The compound is known to occur in many lichens, and it is important in the taxonomy of species in several genera, such as Pertusaria and Pyxine. More than a dozen lichen species have a variation of the word lichexanthone incorporated as part of their binomial name. The presence of lichexanthone in lichens causes them to fluoresce a greenish-yellow colour under long-wavelength UV light; this feature is used to help identify some species. Lichexanthone is also found in several plants (many are from the families Annonaceae and Rutaceae), and some species of fungi that do not form lichens.

In lichens, the biosynthesis of lichexanthone occurs through a set of enzymatic reactions that start with the molecule acetyl-CoA and sequentially add successive units, forming a longer chain that is cyclized into a double-ring structure. Although it has been suggested that lichexanthone functions in nature as a photoprotectant—protecting resident algal populations (photobionts) in lichens from high-intensity solar radiation—its complete ecological function is not fully understood. Some biological activities of lichexanthone that have been demonstrated in the laboratory include antibacterial, larvicidal, and sperm motility-enhancing activities. Many lichexanthone derivatives are known, some produced naturally in lichens, and others created synthetically; like lichexanthone, some of these derivatives are also biologically active.

== History ==
Lichexanthone was first reported by Japanese chemists Yasuhiko Asahina and Hisasi Nogami in 1942. They isolated the lichen product from Parmelia formosana (known today as Hypotrachyna osseoalba), a lichen that is widespread in Asia. Another early publication described its isolation from Parmelia quercina (now Parmelina quercina). Lichexanthone was the first xanthone to be reported from lichens, and it was given its name by Asahina and Nogami for this reason.

Asahina and Nogami used a chemical method called potash fusion (decomposition with a hot solution of the strong base potassium hydroxide) on lichexanthone to produce orcinol. The earliest syntheses of lichexanthone used orsellinic aldehyde and phloroglucinol as starting reactants in the Tanase method. This method, one of six standard ways of synthesising xanthone derivatives, enables the creation of partially methylated polyhydroxyxanthones. In the reaction, the two substrates, in the presence of hydrochloric acid and acetic acid, produce a fluorone derivative that is subsequently reduced to give a xanthene derivative, which, after subsequent methylation and oxidation, leads to a xanthone with three methoxy groups. Afterwards, one of the methoxy groups is demethylated to yield lichexanthone. A simpler synthesis, starting from everninic acid (2-hydroxy-4-methoxy-6-methylbenzoic acid) and phloroglucinol, was proposed in 1956. These early syntheses also helped to confirm the structure of lichexanthone before spectral methods of analysis were widely available. In 1977, Harris and Hay proposed a biogenetically modelled synthesis of lichexanthone starting from the polycarbonyl compound 3,5,7,9,11,13-hexaoxotetradecanoic acid. In this synthesis, an aldol cyclization between positions 8 and 13 followed by a Claisen cyclization between positions 1 and 6 leads to the formation of a group of compounds that includes lichexanthone.

== Properties ==
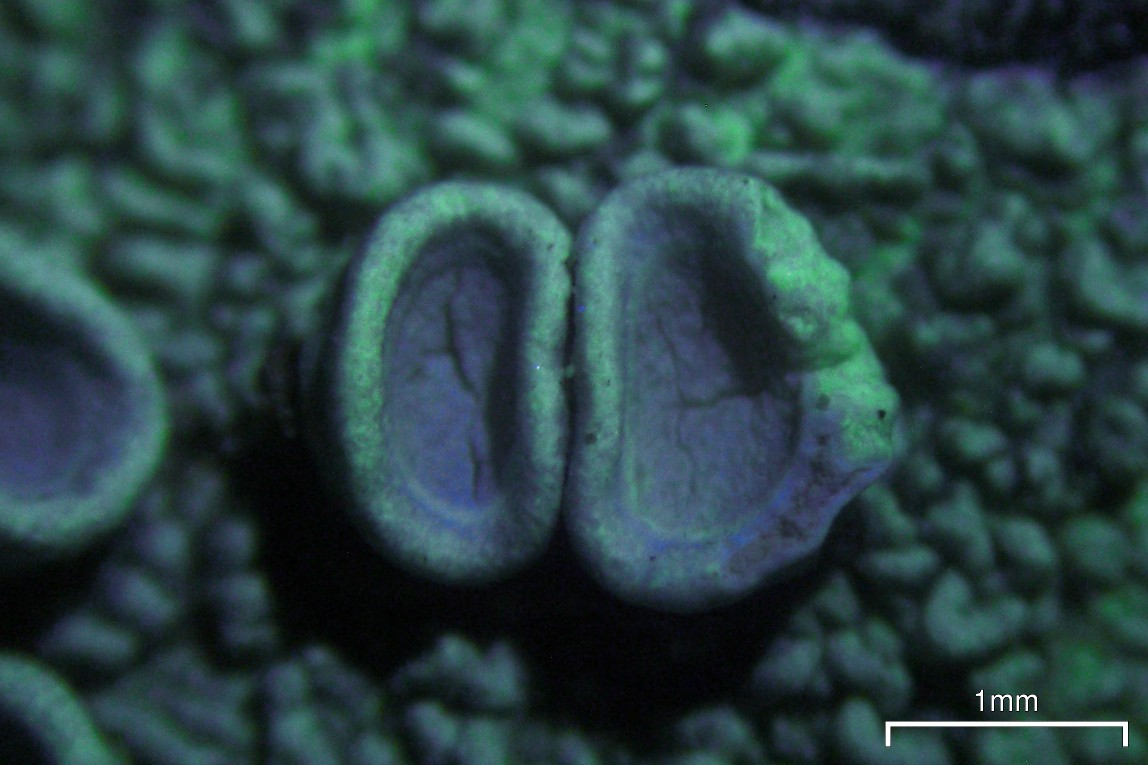
UV-illuminated thallus and apothecia of the crustose lichen Ochrolechia africana; the yellowish colour results from the fluorescence of lichexanthone.

Lichexanthone is a member of the class of chemical compounds called xanthones. Specifically, it is a 9H-xanthen-9-one substituted by a hydroxy group at position 1, a methyl group at position 8 and methoxy groups at positions 3 and 6. Its IUPAC name is 1-hydroxy-3,6-dimethoxy-8-methyl-9H-xanthen-9-one. Lichexanthone's molecular formula is C_{16}H_{14}O_{5}; it has a molecular mass of 286.27 grams per mole. In its purified crystalline form, it exists as long yellow prisms with a melting point of 189–190 °C (372–374 °F). Its crystal structure is part of the monoclinic crystal system, in the space group called P2_{1}/c. An ethanolic solution of lichexanthone reacts with iron(III) chloride to produce a purple colour; an acetic acid solution containing lichexanthone will emit a greenish fluorescence after adding a drop of concentrated sulfuric acid. The presence of the compound in lichens causes them to fluoresce yellow under long-wavelength UV light, a property that is used as a tool in lichen species identification.

The mass spectrum of lichexanthone was reported in 1968. It features a strong parent peak at m/z (mass-to-charge ratio) of 286, and weaker-intensity rearrangement peaks at 257, 243, and 200. A 2009 study on the electrochemical reduction of the compound used techniques such as cyclic voltammetry with rotating disc and rotating ring electrodes, and controlled-potential electrolysis to characterise the reduction mechanism of lichexanthone, and to better understand the nature of its chemical reactivity. The complete proton nuclear magnetic resonance (^{1}H NMR) and carbon-13 nuclear magnetic resonance (^{13}C NMR) spectral assignments for lichexanthone were reported in 2010, as well as its crystal structure determined using X-ray diffraction.

=== Biological activities ===
Various biological activities of lichexanthone, studied using in vitro experiments, have been recorded in the scientific literature. The antimicrobial activity of the bark-dwelling lichen Marcelaria benguelensis is largely attributed to the presence of lichexanthone. Chemically unmodified lichexanthone has weak antimycobacterial activity against Mycobacterium tuberculosis and M. aurum. However, a dihydropyrane derivative of lichexanthone had antimycobacterial activity similar to that of drugs commonly used to treat tuberculosis. Lichexanthone has a strong antibacterial effect towards Bacillus subtilis, and also inhibits the growth of methicillin-resistant Staphylococcus aureus. In contrast, no antiparasitic activity was detected against either Plasmodium falciparum or Trypanosoma brucei, nor did it have any cytotoxic activity against a variety of cancer cell lines.

In laboratory tests, the presence of lichexanthone enhances the motility of human sperm; there are only a few compounds known to have this effect. The chemical also has larvicidal activity against second-instar larvae of the mosquito Aedes aegypti, a vector of the Dengue virus.

== Biosynthesis ==
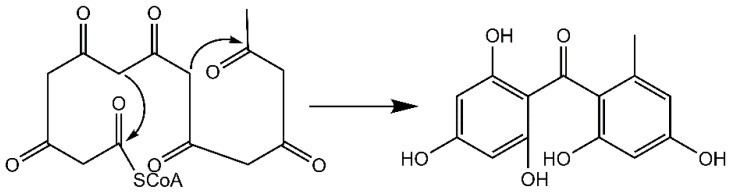
Part of a proposed biosynthetic pathway for lichexanthone-type lichen xanthones, depicting an aldol cyclization step followed by a cyclodehydration, which would lead to norlichexanthone.

In lichens, biosynthesis of lichexanthone occurs through the acetate-malonate metabolic pathway, which uses acetyl coenzyme A as a precursor. In this pathway, polyketides are created by the sequential reactions of a variety of polyketide synthases. These enzymes control a number of enzymatic reactions through several coordinated active sites on a large multienzyme protein complex. The structure of lichen xanthones is derived by linear condensation of seven acetate and malonate units with one orsellinic acid-type cyclisation. The two rings are joined by a ketonic carbon and by an ether-oxygen arising from cyclodehydration (i.e., a dehydration reaction leading to the formation of a cyclic compound). The exact mechanism is not known, but this ring closure might proceed through a benzophenone intermediate that could dehydrate to yield the central pyrone core of lichexanthone.

A standardized high-performance liquid chromatography (HPLC) assay has been described to identify many lichen-derived substances, including lichexanthone and many other xanthones; because many xanthone isomers have different retention times, this technique can be used to identify complex mixtures of structurally similar derivatives. The technique was later refined to couple the HPLC output with a photodiode array detector to screen for xanthones based on their specific ultraviolet–visible spectra. In this way, lichexanthone is detected by monitoring its retention time, and verifying the presence of three peaks representing wavelengths of maximum absorption (λ_{max}) at 208, 242, and 310 nm.

== Occurrence ==
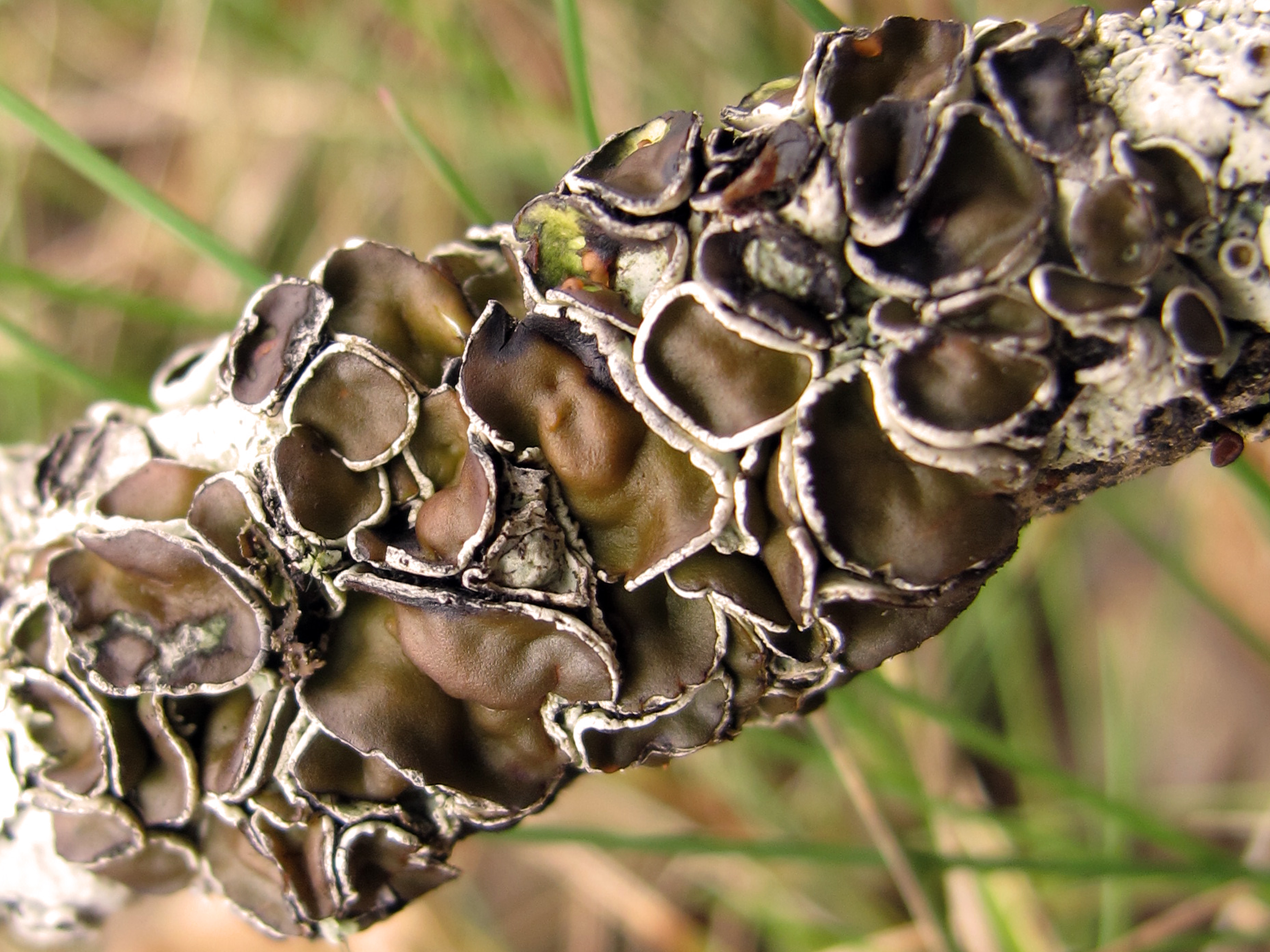
Parmelina quercina is one of the first lichens from which lichexanthone was isolated.

Although first isolated from foliose (leafy) Parmelia species, lichexanthone has since been found in a wide variety of lichens. For example, in the foliose genus Hypotrachyna, it is found in about a dozen species; when present, it usually completely replaces other cortical substances common in that genus, like atranorin and usnic acid. The presence or absence of lichexanthone is a character used in classifying species of the predominantly tropical genus Pyxine; of about 70 species in the genus, 20 contain lichexanthone. This represents the largest group of foliose lichens with the compound, as it is generally restricted to some groups of tropical crustose lichens, chiefly pyrenocarps and Graphidaceae. The large genus Pertusaria relies heavily on thallus chemistry to distinguish and classify species, some of which differ only in the presence or absence of a single secondary chemical. Lichexanthone, norlichexanthone, and their chlorinated derivatives are common in this genus.

Although normally considered a secondary metabolite of lichens, lichexanthone has also been isolated from several plants, listed here organized by family:

- Annonaceae: Annona muricata, Guatteria blepharophylla, Rollinia leptopetala
- Clusiaceae: Garcinia forbesii
- Euphorbiaceae: Croton cuneatus
- Gentianaceae: Anthocleista djalonensis
- Hypericaceae: Vismia baccifera var. dealbata
- Meliaceae: Trichilia rubescens
- Melastomataceae: Henriettella fascicularis
- Olacaceae: Minquartia guianensis
- Polygonaceae: Ruprechtia tangarana
- Rutaceae: Clausena excavata, Feroniella lucida, Zanthoxylum microcarpum, Z. valens, Z. setulosum, Z. tetraspermum
- Sapindaceae: Cupania cinerea
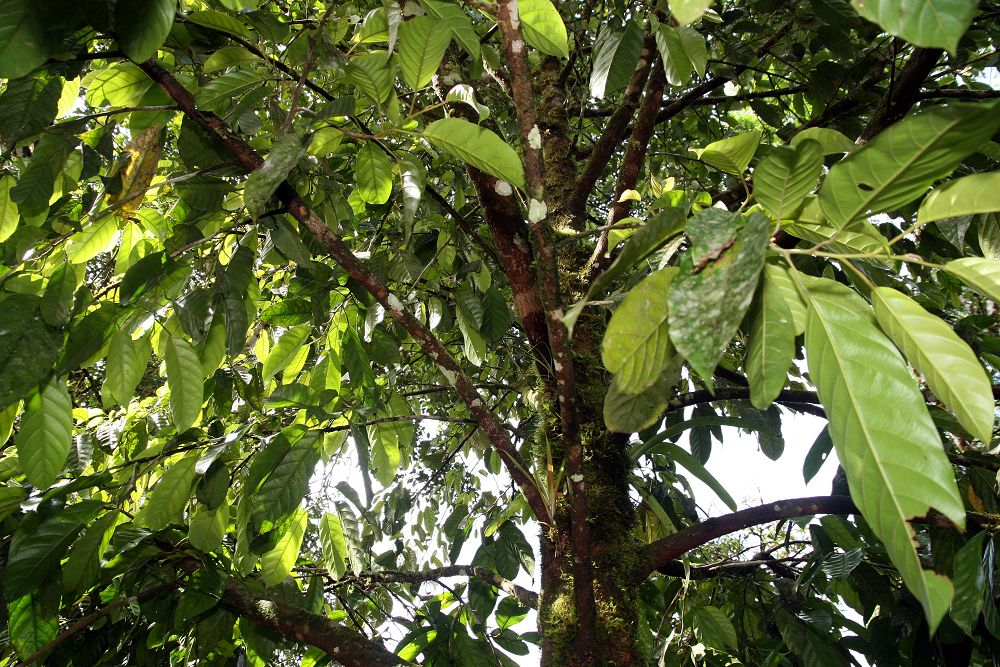
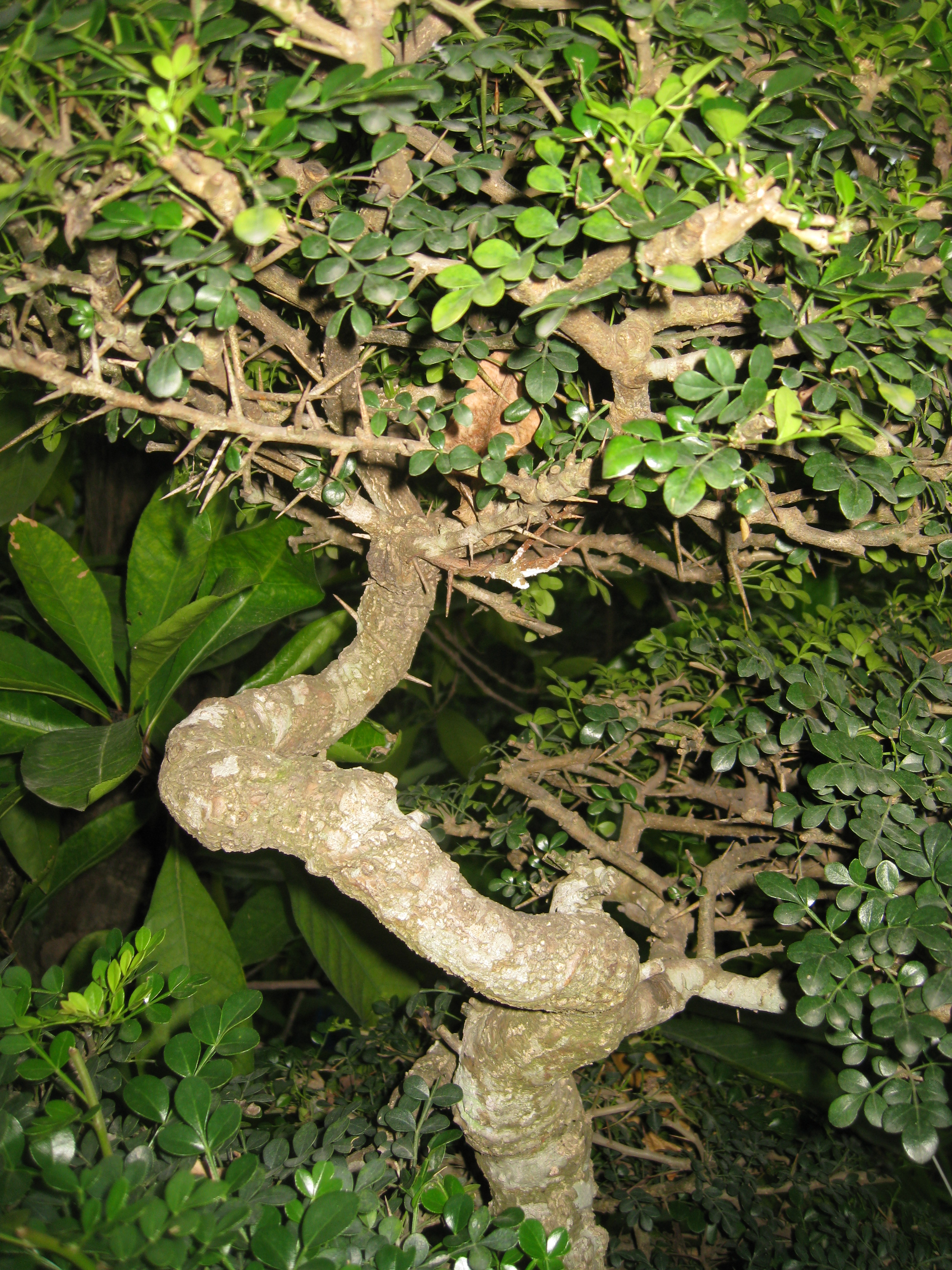
Minquartia guianensis (left) and Feroniella lucida are two tropical plants that contain lichexanthone.

Lichexanthone has also been reported to occur in the bark of Faramea cyanea, although in that case it was suspected to have originated from a lichen growing on the bark. Additionally, two non-lichenised fungus species, Penicillium persicinum and Penicillium vulpinum, can synthesize lichexanthone.

Xanthones are known to have strong UV-absorbing properties. In experiments using laboratory-grown mycobionts from the lichen Haematomma fluorescens, the synthesis of lichexanthone was induced when young mycelia were exposed to long-wavelength UV light (365 nm) for three to four hours every week over a time span of three to four months. In the natural lichen, the compound is present in both the outer cortical layer of the thallus and in the exciple (rim) of the ascomata. Lichexanthone may function as a light filter to protect the UV-sensitive algal layer in lichens from high-intensity solar radiation. The presence of the photoprotective chemical in the cortex may allow them to survive in otherwise inhospitable habitats, like on exposed trees in tropical areas or high mountains. It has been pointed out, however, that lichexanthone is also found in lichens living in less stressed environments, and from species that are in families where cortical substances are rare. In some instances, similar or related species exist that lack cortical substances entirely, suggesting that the actual ecological function of lichexanthone is not fully understood.

== Related compounds ==
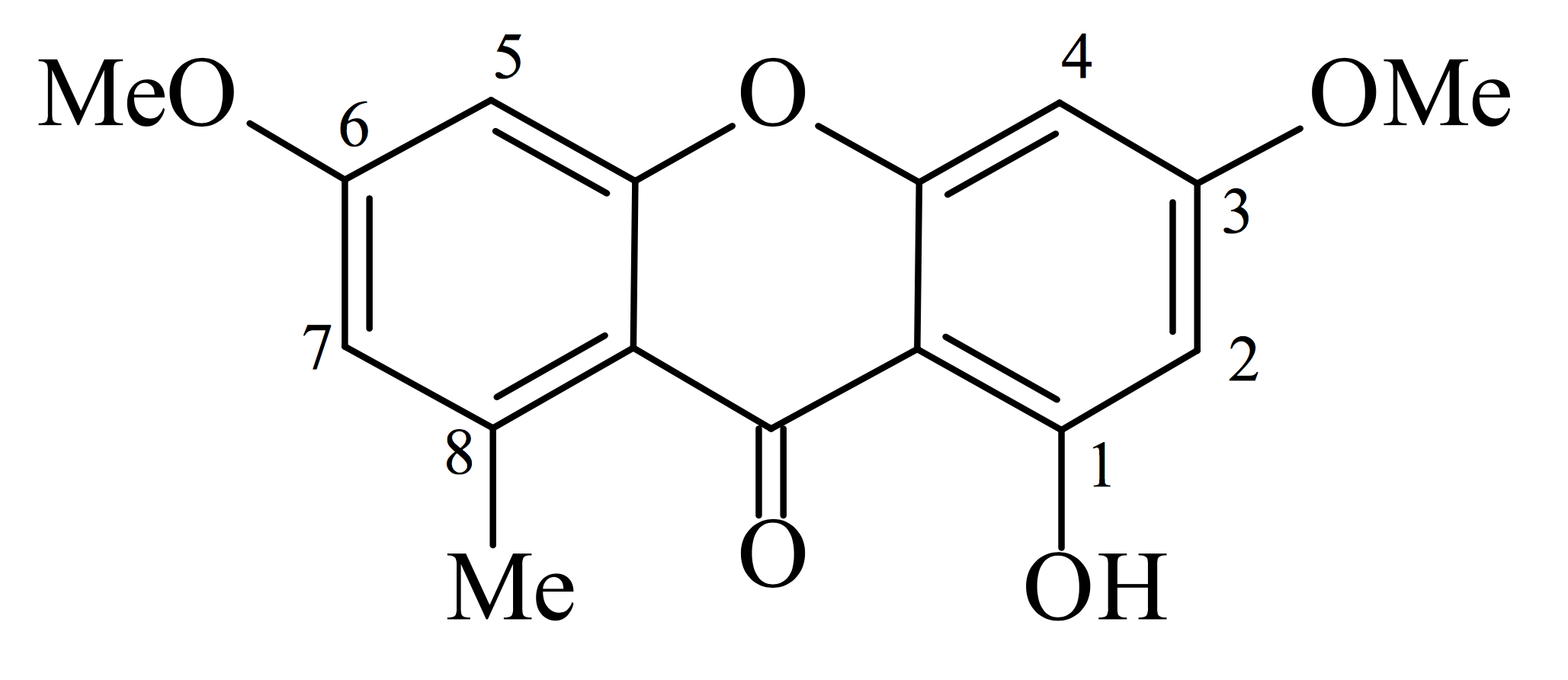
Numbering scheme for lichexanthone; Me = methyl (–CH_{3})

Norlichexanthone (1,3,6-trihydroxy-8-methylxanthone) differs from lichexanthone in having hydroxy rather than methoxy groups at positions 3 and 6. In griseoxanthone C (1,6-dihydroxy-3-methoxy-8-methylxanthen-9-one), the methoxy at position 6 of lichexanthone is replaced with a hydroxy. Dozens of chlorinated lichexanthone derivatives have been reported, some isolated from a variety of lichen species, and some produced synthetically. These derivatives are variously mono-, bi-, or trichlorinated with the chlorines at positions 2, 4, 5, and 7. As of 2016, 62 molecules with the lichexanthone scaffold had been described, and another eight additional lichexanthone derivatives were considered "putative"–thought to exist in nature, but not yet discovered in lichens.

The effects of chlorine substituents on some structural and electronic properties of lichexanthones have been studied with quantum mechanical theory, to better understand things such as intramolecular interactions, aromaticity of the three rings, interactions between ionic and halogen bonds, and binding energies of complexes formed between lichexanthone, magnesium ion (Mg^{+2}) and NH_{3}. A series of lichexanthone derivatives were synthesized and assessed for antimycobacterial activity against Mycobacterium tuberculosis. These derivatives consisted of ω-bromo and ω-aminoalkoxylxanthones; lichexanthone and several derivatives were found to have weak antimycobacterial activity. According to the authors, this chemometrics approach was useful to correlate structural and chemical features with in vitro antimycobacterial activity among the group of ω-aminoalkoxylxanthones.

== Eponyms ==
Some authors have explicitly named lichexanthone in the specific epithets of their published lichen species, thereby acknowledging the presence of this compound as an important taxonomic characteristic. These eponyms are listed here, followed by their author citation and year of publication. All of these species occur in Brazil:

- Parmotrema lichexanthonicum Eliasaro & Adler (1997)
- Lecanora lichexanthona Guderley (2000)
- Crypthonia lichexanthonica A.A.Menezes, M.Cáceres & Aptroot (2013)
- Cryptothecia lichexanthonica E.L.Lima, Aptroot & M.Cáceres (2013)
- Buellia lichexanthonica Aptroot & M.Cáceres (2017)
- Chiodecton lichexanthonicum M.Cáceres & Aptroot (2017)
- Enterographa lichexanthonica M.Cáceres & Aptroot (2017)
- Cladonia lichexanthonica Aptroot & Cáceres (2018)
- Pertusaria lichexanthofarinosa Aptroot & Cáceres (2018)
- Pertusaria lichexanthoimmersa Aptroot & Cáceres (2018)
- Pertusaria lichexanthoverrucosa Aptroot & Cáceres (2018)
- Diorygma isidiolichexanthonicum Aptroot (2020)
- Caprettia lichexanthotricha Aptroot & M.F.Souza (2021)
- Lecanora lichexanthoxylina Aptroot & M.F.Souza (2021)
- Lepra lichexanthonorstictica Aptroot (2021) – named for both lichexanthone and norstictic acid
- Aggregatorygma lichexanthonicum Aptroot (2022)
- Allographa lichexanthonica Aptroot (2023)
- Ocellularia fuscolichexanthonica Aptroot (2023)
- Ocellularia lichexanthocavata Aptroot (2023)

In the case of Crypthonia, Chiodecton, Cladonia, and Caprettia, the listed species are the only members of those genera that contain lichexanthone.
