= Methylocapsa palsarum =

Scientific classification
- Domain: Bacteria
- Kingdom: Pseudomonadati
- Phylum: Pseudomonadota
- Class: Alphaproteobacteria
- Order: Hyphomicrobiales
- Family: Beijerinckiaceae
- Genus: Methylocapsa
- Species: M. palsarum

Binomial name
- Methylocapsa palsarum Dedysh et al. 2015

Type strain
- LMG 28715, NE2, VKM B-2945

Species of bacterium

Methylocapsa palsarum is a Gram-negative, aerobic, methanotrophic and non-motile bacteria from the genus Methylocapsa which has been isolated from a palsa in Norway.
