= Methyloferula stellata =

Scientific classification
- Domain: Bacteria
- Kingdom: Pseudomonadati
- Phylum: Pseudomonadota
- Class: Alphaproteobacteria
- Order: Hyphomicrobiales
- Family: Beijerinckiaceae
- Genus: Methyloferula
- Species: M. stellata

Binomial name
- Methyloferula stellata Vorobev et al. 2011

Type strain
- AR4, DSM 22108, LMG 25277, VKM B-2543

Synonyms
- Methyloferula sphagni

Species of bacterium

Methyloferula stellata is a Gram-negative and non-motile bacteria from the genus of Methyloferula which has been isolated from acidic peat soil from Arkhangelsk in Russia. In contrast to most known Methanotrophs Methyloferula stellata is an aerobic acidophilic methanotroph. This makes it similar to Methylocella species, however it is unable to grow on multicarbon substrates. Its genome was sequenced in March and April 2015.
