= Needle ice =

Ice column formed when liquid groundwater rises into freezing air

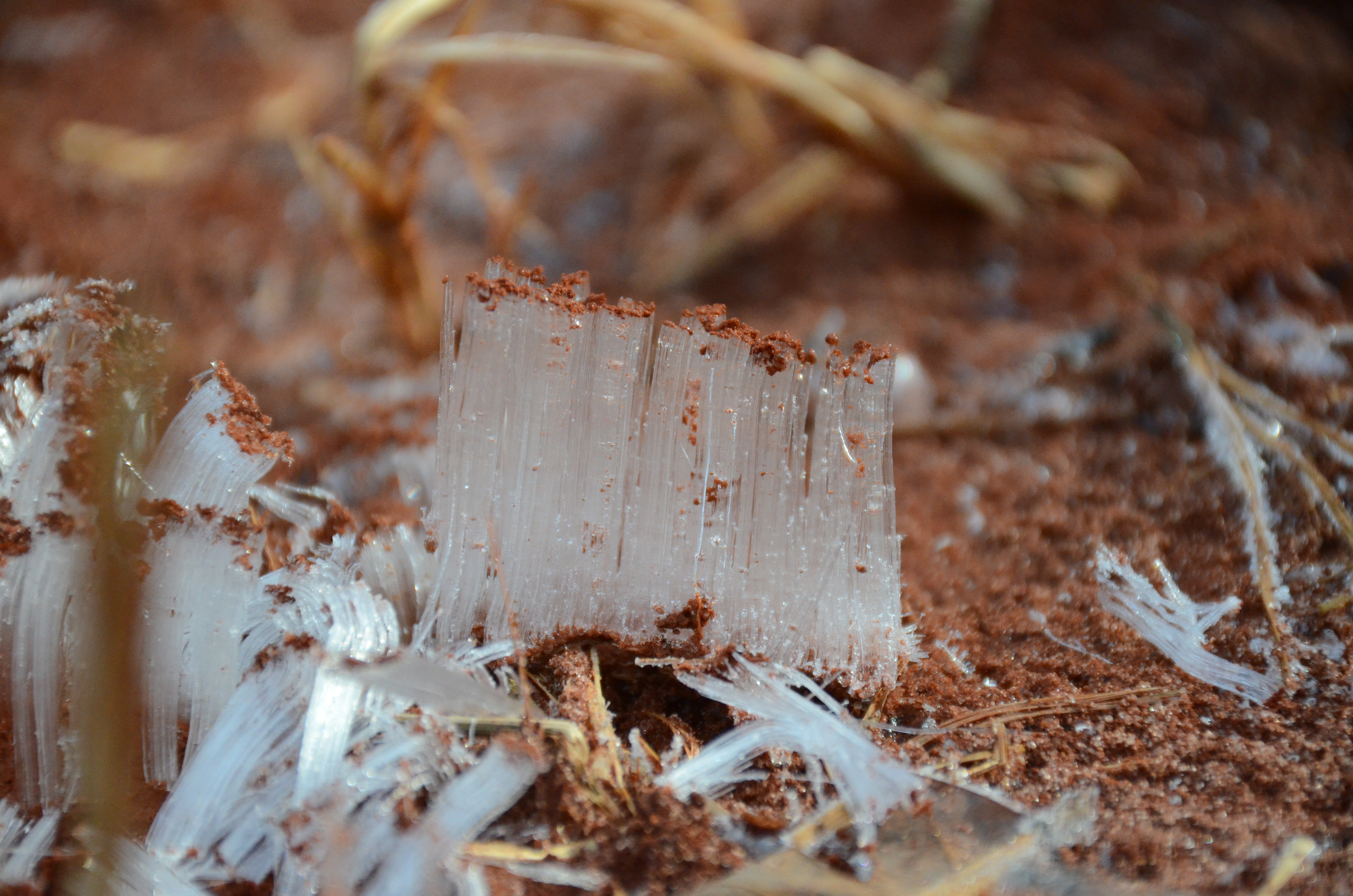
Needle Ice forming in a pile of red clay soil

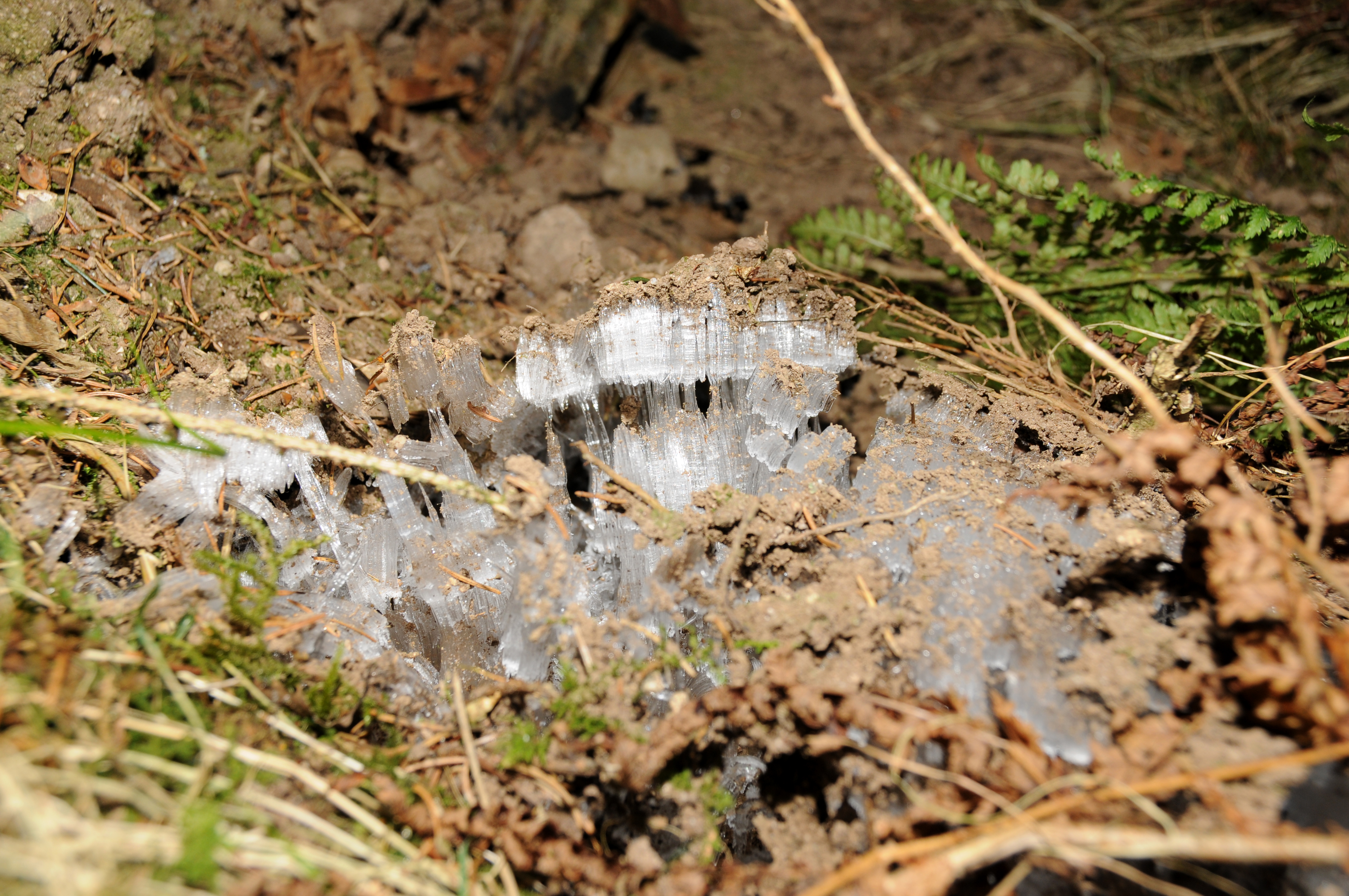
Needle ice pushing up soil particles

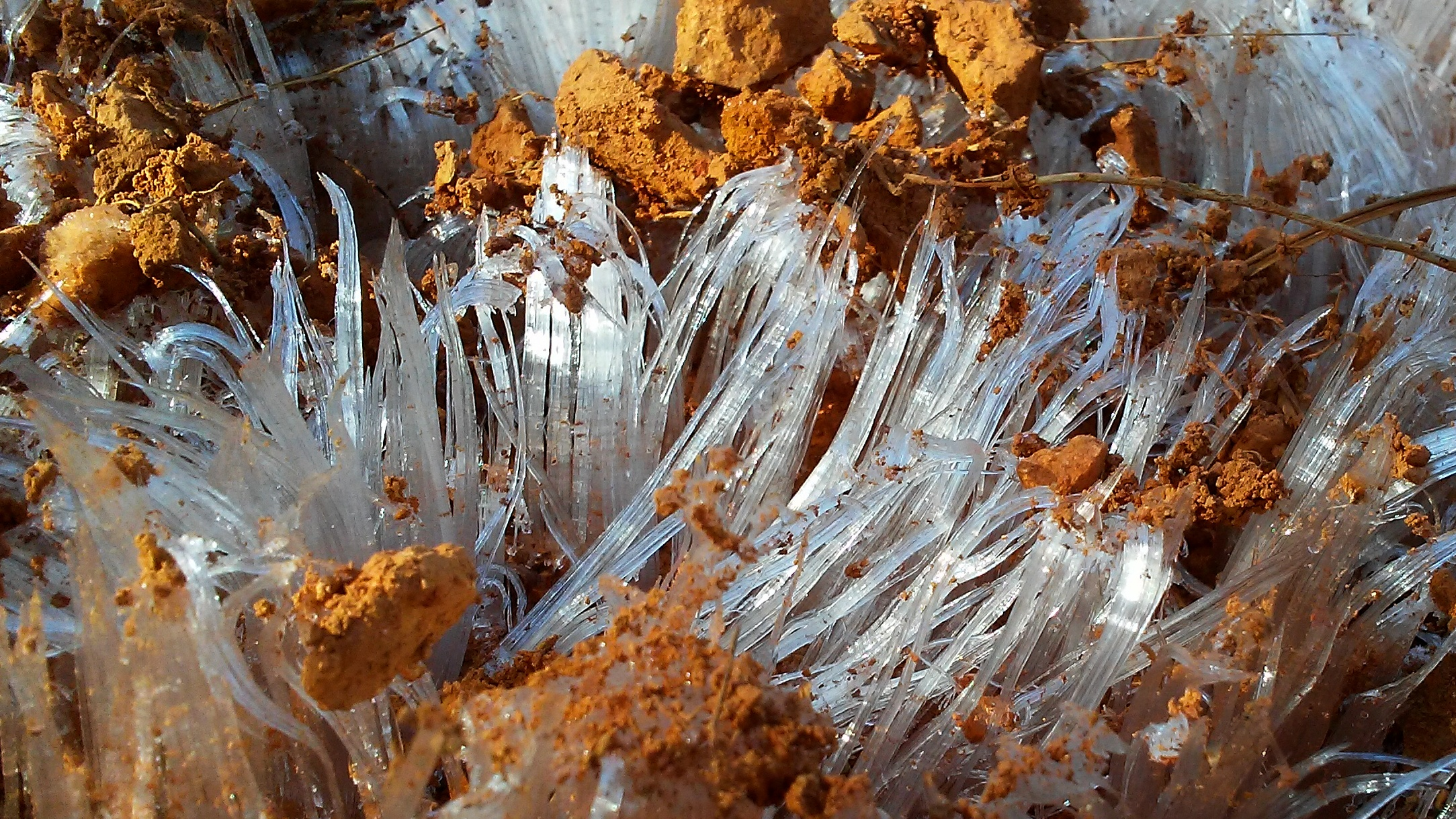
Needle ice is formed of distinct, unconsolidated strands

Needle ice is a needle-shaped column of ice formed by groundwater. Needle ice forms when the temperature of the soil is above 0 °C (32 °F) and the surface temperature of the air is below 0 °C (32 °F). Liquid water underground rises to the surface by capillary action, and then freezes and contributes to a growing needle-like ice column. The process usually occurs at night when the air temperature reaches its minimum.

The ice needles are typically a few centimetres long. While growing, they may lift or push away small soil particles. On sloped surfaces, needle ice may be a factor contributing to soil creep.

Alternate names for needle ice are "frost pillars" ("Säuleneis" in German), "frost column", "Spew Ice", "Kammeis" (a German term meaning "comb ice"), "Stängeleis" (another German term referring to the stem-like structures), "shimobashira" (霜柱, a Japanese term meaning frost pillars), or "pipkrake" (from Swedish pipa (tube) and krake (weak, fine), coined in 1907 by Henrik Hesselman).

The similar phenomena of frost flowers and hair ice can occur on living or dead plants, especially on wood.

== Formation ==
In order for needle ice to form there needs to be a process of ice segregation, which only occurs in a porous medium when supercooled water freezes into existing ice, growing away from the ice/water interface. As water permeates the ice, it becomes segregated into separate pieces of ice in the form of lenses, ribbons, needles, layers or strands of ice.

Needle ice is commonly found along stream banks or soil terraces. It is also found by gaps around stones and others areas of patterned ground. The variety of soil properties also affects where it is found. Places where the soil is much deeper and richer can affect the growth of the ice. Consequently, the deeper the soil, the larger the water content allows it to develop. It can be evidently formed anywhere where underground water is exposed to open (freezing) air.

Needle ice is most suitable in soils with a high silt and organic matter content. Needle ice consists of groups of narrow ice slivers that are up to several centimeters long. Although the literature states that the largest recorded needle ice was at 10 cm in length, specimens 15-20 cm in length have been observed at Gerðuberg, for example.

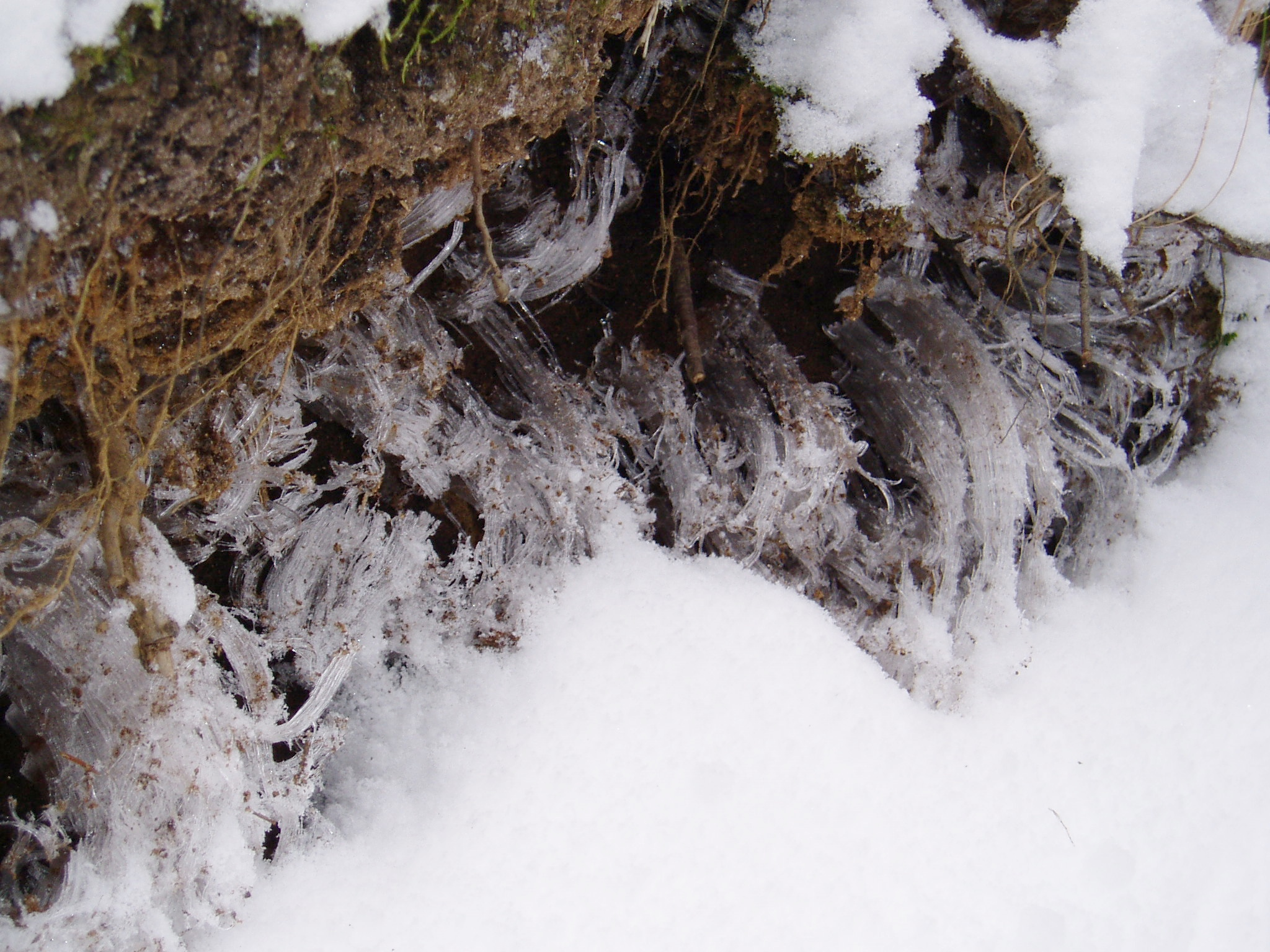
Needle ice can sometimes appear to curve or curl

Needle ice grows up slowly from the moist and water-penetrable soil, and melts gradually in the sun. It can vary in appearance but always shows the consistent growth of ice perpendicular to the surface of the ground. Needle ice looks like a series of filamentous crystals, and is straight or curved in shape. It usually forms in the morning when the temperature drops below freezing point (0 °C).

== Environmental impacts ==
The emergence of needle ice has been recognized as a geomorphic agent of soil disturbance, causing a number of small-scale landforms. Needle ice phenomena play a particularly significant role in patterned ground in periglacial environments.

The growth of needle ice lifts a detached, frozen soil crust riding on top of the layer of ice. When the crust and the ice melt, the soil surface settles back irregularly. This phenomenon is linked to erosion, particularly on streambanks.

Needle ice tends to move rocks in the soil up toward the surface and to shift rocks on the surface into nearby depressions. Depressions caused by needle ice activity are known as needle-ice pans, and lumps caused by needle ice are known as "nubbins".

=== Plant growth ===
Needle ice affects the growth of plants. Seedlings are often heaved to this surface by needle ice. When the ground hardens the stems and roots of the seedling, they are gripped by the soil and then the formation of needle ice is what pushes them up and out the ground. When the needle ice melts, the seedlings do not settle correctly back into the ground causing them to die. Even if the seedlings are partially heaved by the needle ice, they can still die due to root desiccation.

== See also ==
- Frost heaving
- Frost
- Frost flowers
- Hair ice
- Ice spike
