= Methylocapsa aurea =

Scientific classification
- Domain: Bacteria
- Kingdom: Pseudomonadati
- Phylum: Pseudomonadota
- Class: Alphaproteobacteria
- Order: Hyphomicrobiales
- Family: Beijerinckiaceae
- Genus: Methylocapsa
- Species: M. aurea

Binomial name
- Methylocapsa aurea Dunfield et al. 2010

Type strain
- DSM 22158, KYG, VKM B-2544

Species of bacterium

Methylocapsa aurea is a Gram-negative, aerobic, non-motile bacteria from the genus Methylocapsa which was isolated from forest soil in Germany. It is a facultative methanotroph.
