= Pseudochelatococcus lubricantis =

Scientific classification
- Domain: Bacteria
- Kingdom: Pseudomonadati
- Phylum: Pseudomonadota
- Class: Alphaproteobacteria
- Order: Hyphomicrobiales
- Family: Beijerinckiaceae
- Genus: Pseudochelatococcus
- Species: P. lubricantis

Binomial name
- Pseudochelatococcus lubricantis Kämpfer et al. 2015

Type strain
- CCM 8528, CIP 110802, LMG 28286, MPA 1113

Species of bacterium

Pseudochelatococcus lubricantis is a Gram-negative, rod-shaped and non-spore-forming bacteria from the genus of Pseudochelatococcus which has been isolated from coolant from a metal working emulsion in Germany.
