= Methylocella tundrae =

Scientific classification
- Domain: Bacteria
- Kingdom: Pseudomonadati
- Phylum: Pseudomonadota
- Class: Alphaproteobacteria
- Order: Hyphomicrobiales
- Family: Beijerinckiaceae
- Genus: Methylocella
- Species: M. tundrae

Binomial name
- Methylocella tundrae Dedysh et al. 2004

Species of bacterium

Methylocella tundrae is a species of bacterium. It is notable for oxidising methane. Its cells are aerobic, Gram-negative, non-motile, dinitrogen-fixing rods. Strain T4^{T} (=DSM 15673^{T} =NCIMB 13949^{T}) is the type strain.
