= Beijerinckia indica =

Scientific classification
- Domain: Bacteria
- Kingdom: Pseudomonadati
- Phylum: Pseudomonadota
- Class: Alphaproteobacteria
- Order: Hyphomicrobiales
- Family: Beijerinckiaceae
- Genus: Beijerinckia
- Species: B. indica

Binomial name
- Beijerinckia indica Derx 1950

Synonyms
- Azotobacter acida; Azotobacter indicum; Azotobacter lacticogenes; Beijerinckia acida

Species of bacterium

Beijerinckia indica is a nitrogen fixing, aerobic acidophilic bacteria from the genus Beijerinckia.
