= Methylocella silvestris =

Scientific classification
- Domain: Bacteria
- Kingdom: Pseudomonadati
- Phylum: Pseudomonadota
- Class: Alphaproteobacteria
- Order: Hyphomicrobiales
- Family: Beijerinckiaceae
- Genus: Methylocella
- Species: M. silvestris

Binomial name
- Methylocella silvestris Dunfield et al., 2003

Species of bacterium

Methylocella silvestris is a bacterium from the genus Methylocella which are found in many acidic soils and wetlands. Historically, Methylocella silvestris was originally isolated from acidic forest soils in Germany, and it is described as Gram-negative, aerobic, non-pigmented, non-motile, rod-shaped and methane-oxidizing facultative methanotroph. As an aerobic methanotrophic bacteria, Methylocella spp use methane (CH_{4}), and methanol as their main carbon and energy source, as well as multi compounds acetate, pyruvate, succinate, malate, and ethanol. They were known to survive in the cold temperature from 4° to 30° degree of Celsius with the optimum at around 15° to 25 °C, but no more than 36 °C. They grow better in the pH scale between 4.5 and 7.0. It lacks intracytoplasmic membranes common to all methane-oxidizing bacteria except Methylocella, but contain a vesicular membrane system connected to the cytoplasmic membrane. BL2^{T} (=DSM 15510^{T}=NCIMB 13906^{T}) is the type strain.

== Phylogenetic ==
Dunfield et.al mentioned that Methylocella silvestris is close related with Methylocella palustris K^{T}, Beijerinckia indica ATCC 9039, and Methylocapsa acipihila B2^{T} in terms of its phylogenetic, which make M. silvestris classified as a type II methanotroph that utilize the serine cycle for their carbon assimilation, but it does not have a soluble methane monooxygenase (sMMO) and a propane monooxygenase (PrMO).

== Genome ==
The genome of Methylocella silvestris is sequenced. Methylocella silvestris contains eight genes which can encode NAD(P)-dependent alcohol dehydrogenases (ADHs), pyrroloquinoline quinone (PQQ)-containing methanol dehydrogenase (Msil_0471) and a PQQ-containing ADH with 73% identity to xoxF from Methylobacterium extorquens (Msil_1587). Chen et.al stated in their article that the genome size is 4.3 MbP, and has similarity to Proteobacteria.
