= Beijerinckia derxii =

Scientific classification
- Domain: Bacteria
- Kingdom: Pseudomonadati
- Phylum: Pseudomonadota
- Class: Alphaproteobacteria
- Order: Hyphomicrobiales
- Family: Beijerinckiaceae
- Genus: Beijerinckia
- Species: B. derxii

Binomial name
- Beijerinckia derxii Tchan 1957

Type strain
- ACM 1968, ATCC 49361, CCUG 53677, DSM 2328, KCTC 12016, LMG 3899, Q13, UQM 1968, WR-219

Synonyms
- Beijerinckia venezuelae

Species of bacterium

Beijerinckia derxii is a nitrogen fixing strain of bacteria from the genus Beijerinckia.
