= Pseudochelatococcus contaminans =

Scientific classification
- Domain: Bacteria
- Kingdom: Pseudomonadati
- Phylum: Pseudomonadota
- Class: Alphaproteobacteria
- Order: Hyphomicrobiales
- Family: Beijerinckiaceae
- Genus: Pseudochelatococcus
- Species: P. contaminans

Binomial name
- Pseudochelatococcus contaminans Kämpfer et al. 2015

Type strain
- CCM 8527, LMG 28285, MPA 1105

Species of bacterium

Pseudochelatococcus contaminans is a bacterium from the genus of Pseudochelatococcus, which has been isolated from coolant from a metal working emulsion in Germany.
