= Methylorosula polaris =

Scientific classification
- Domain: Bacteria
- Kingdom: Pseudomonadati
- Phylum: Pseudomonadota
- Class: Alphaproteobacteria
- Order: Hyphomicrobiales
- Family: Beijerinckiaceae
- Genus: Methylorosula
- Species: M. polaris

Binomial name
- Methylorosula polaris Berestovskaya et al. 2012

Type strain
- DSM 22001, V-2485, V-022, V-22

Species of bacterium

Methylorosula polaris is a Gram-negative, aerobic, facultatively methylotrophic, psychrotolerant and motile bacteria from the genus of Methylorosula with bipolar flagella which has been isolated from tundra wetland soil in Vorkuta in Russia.
