= Lithal =

Lithal can mean:

- Lithium aluminium hydride (LiAlH_{4}), also abbreviated to LAH, a powerful reducing agent used in organic synthesis
- Lithalsa, a term sometimes used in geomorphology for designing a pingo, a palsa, or a hydrolaccolith
