= Methylocapsa acidiphila =

Scientific classification
- Domain: Bacteria
- Kingdom: Pseudomonadati
- Phylum: Pseudomonadota
- Class: Alphaproteobacteria
- Order: Hyphomicrobiales
- Family: Beijerinckiaceae
- Genus: Methylocapsa
- Species: M. acidiphila

Binomial name
- Methylocapsa acidiphila Dedysh et al. 2002

Species of bacterium

Methylocapsa acidiphila is a bacterium. It is a methane-oxidizing and dinitrogen-fixing acidophilic bacterium first isolated from Sphagnum bog. Its cells are aerobic, gram-negative, colourless, non-motile, curved coccoids that form conglomerates covered by an extracellular polysaccharide matrix. The cells use methane and methanol as sole sources of carbon and energy. B2^{T} (= DSM 13967^{T} = NCIMB 13765^{T}) is the type strain.
