= Beijerinckia mobilis =

Scientific classification
- Domain: Bacteria
- Kingdom: Pseudomonadati
- Phylum: Pseudomonadota
- Class: Alphaproteobacteria
- Order: Hyphomicrobiales
- Family: Beijerinckiaceae
- Genus: Beijerinckia
- Species: B. mobilis

Binomial name
- Beijerinckia mobilis Derx 1950

Type strain
- ACM 1969, ATCC 35011, CCUG 51003, CECT 4464, Delft #1, Delft E.III.12.2.1, Derx 092, DSM 2326, KCTC 12013, LMD 50.27, LMG 3912, NCCB 50027, Thompson WR-237, UQM 1969, WR237

Species of bacterium

Beijerinckia mobilis is a nitrogen fixing bacteria from the genus Beijerinckia.
