= Zero-curtain effect =

Soil phenomenon where water remains liquid at 0°C due to dissolved solutes

Theoretical illustration of the zero-curtain effect over a 12-month period

The zero-curtain effect occurs in cold (particularly periglacial) environments where the phase transition of water to ice is slowed due to latent heat release. The effect is notably found in arctic and alpine permafrost sediments, and occurs where the air temperature falls below 0 °C (32 °F; 273 K), the freezing point of water, followed by a rapid drop in soil temperature.

Because of this effect, the lowering of temperature in moist, cold ground does not happen at a uniform rate. The loss of heat through conduction is reduced when water freezes, and latent heat is released. This heat of fusion is continually released until all the subsurface water has frozen, at which point temperatures can continue to fall.

Therefore, for as long as water is available to the system (for example, through cryosuction/capillary action) the temperature of the sediment will remain at a constant temperature.
