= Beijerinckia doebereinerae =

Scientific classification
- Domain: Bacteria
- Kingdom: Pseudomonadati
- Phylum: Pseudomonadota
- Class: Alphaproteobacteria
- Order: Hyphomicrobiales
- Family: Beijerinckiaceae
- Genus: Beijerinckia
- Species: B. doebereinerae

Binomial name
- Beijerinckia doebereinerae Oggerin et al. 2009

Type strain
- CECT 7311, DSM 19635, LMG 2819, strain BF-2819, strain Hilger

Species of bacterium

Beijerinckia doebereinerae is a bacterium from the genus Beijerinckia.
