= Methylocella palustris =

Scientific classification
- Domain: Bacteria
- Kingdom: Pseudomonadati
- Phylum: Pseudomonadota
- Class: Alphaproteobacteria
- Order: Hyphomicrobiales
- Family: Beijerinckiaceae
- Genus: Methylocella
- Species: M. palustris

Binomial name
- Methylocella palustris Dedysh et al., 2000

Species of bacterium

Methylocella palustris is a species of bacterium. It is notable for oxidising methane. It is acidophilic and was first found in a peat bogs, representing a novel subtype of serine-pathway methanotrophs, for which a new genus was described. It is aerobic, Gram-negative, colourless, non-motile and its cells can be straight or curved rods. Strain K^{T} (= ATCC 700799^{T}) is the type strain.
