= Methylovirgula ligni =

Scientific classification
- Domain: Bacteria
- Kingdom: Pseudomonadati
- Phylum: Pseudomonadota
- Class: Alphaproteobacteria
- Order: Hyphomicrobiales
- Family: Beijerinckiaceae
- Genus: Methylovirgula
- Species: M. ligni

Binomial name
- Methylovirgula ligni Vorob'ev et al. 2009

Type strain
- BW863, DSM 19998, NCIMB 14408

Species of bacterium

Methylovirgula ligni is a Gram-negative, aerobic, non-motile bacteria from the genus of Methylovirgula which was isolated from the fungus Hypholoma fasciculare in Veluwe in the Netherlands.
