= Palsa =

Low frost heave in polar and subpolar climates

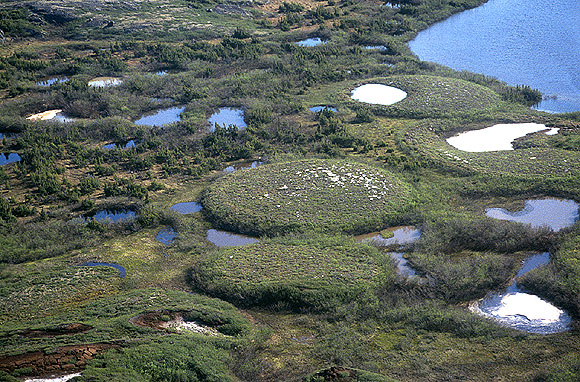
A group of well developed palsas as seen from above

Palsas are peat mounds with a permanently frozen peat and mineral soil core. They are a typical phenomenon in the polar and subpolar zone of discontinuous permafrost. One of their characteristics is having steep slopes that rise above the mire surface. This leads to the accumulation of large amounts of snow around them. The summits of the palsas are free of snow even in winter, because the wind carries the snow and deposits on the slopes and elsewhere on the flat mire surface. Palsas can be up to 150 m (490 ft) in diameter and can reach a height of 12 m (39 ft).

Permafrost is found on palsa mires only in the palsas themselves, and its formation is based on the physical properties of peat. Dry peat is a good insulator, but wet peat conducts heat better, and frozen peat is even better at conducting heat. This means that cold can penetrate deep into the peat layers, and that heat can easily flow from deeper wet layers in winter, whereas the dry peat on the palsa surface insulates the frozen core and prevents it from thawing in the summer. This means that palsas can survive in a climate where the mean annual temperature is just below the freezing point.

A lithalsa is a palsa without peat cover. They exist in a smaller range than palsas, commonly occurring in oceanic climate regimes. However palsas and lithalsas are both relatively small compared to pingos, typically less than 3 m (9.8 ft).

== Palsa development ==
Palsas may be initiated in areas of a moor or bog where the winter freezing front penetrates relatively faster than surrounding areas, perhaps due to an unusually thin cover of snow. The lack of thermal insulation provided by thick snow permits much deeper freezing in winter. This ice may then last through the summer with a persistent 'bump' of up to several cm due to frost heave. The elevated surface of a palsa will tend also to have thinner snow cover, allowing greater winter cooling, while in summer the surface material (especially if organic) will dry out and provide thermal insulation. Thus the interior temperature is consistently lower than that of adjacent ground. This contributes to the formation of an ice lens which grows by drawing up surrounding water. The expansion of the ice upon freezing exerts pressure on the surrounding soil, further forcing water out of its pore spaces which then accumulates on and increases the volume of the growing ice lens. A positive feedback loop develops. Changes in surface moisture and vegetation will then be such as to preserve the newly formed permafrost.

The overlying soil layer is gradually lifted up by frost heaving. In cross-section, the ice cores of a palsa show layering, which is caused by the successive winter freezing intervals. The pressing out of water from the pores is not crucial, however, since the boggy soil is water-saturated and thus always provides enough water for ice core growth.

Many scientists agree that the development of a palsa is cyclic where growth continues until a convex form of the palsa is reached. When this occurs an increasing pressure in the uppermost layer of peat will cause cracks in the peat layer which will result in the sliding of the peat layer toward the sides of the palsa. As this layer of peat generates an insulating effect the regression of the layer will thereby expose the permafrost in the palsa and initiate melting. In this case, the melting of the palsa is a normal part of the cyclic development and, it will be possible for new embryonic palsa forms to develop in the same area. However, the studies done on palsa forms has primarily been observing dome palsas in the northern regions. These study areas lie within the core area for palsa occurrences and therefore are the cyclic development applicable only to dome palsas within the core area.

Palsa plateaus often lack the convex form which causes cracks in the peat layers and the decay of dome palsas. But in palsa plateaus, frost expansion which causes swelling will with time create an uneven surface and increase the possibility for water accumulation on the surface and cause local regression and melting. This process, which causes melting likewise the cracking of the peat layer in dome palsas, is a normal part in the life span of palsa plateaus but are not a part of a cyclic evolvement.

Palsas appear to go through a developmental cycle that eventually leads to thawing and collapse. Open cracks that commonly accompany palsa growth and the water that tends to accumulate around palsas, probably as a result of their weight depressing the adjacent bog surface, are important factors in this process. The fact that palsas in various stages of growth and decay occur together shows that their collapse is not necessarily indicative of climatic change. All that is usually left after a palsa collapses is a depression surrounded by a rim.

== Morphology ==
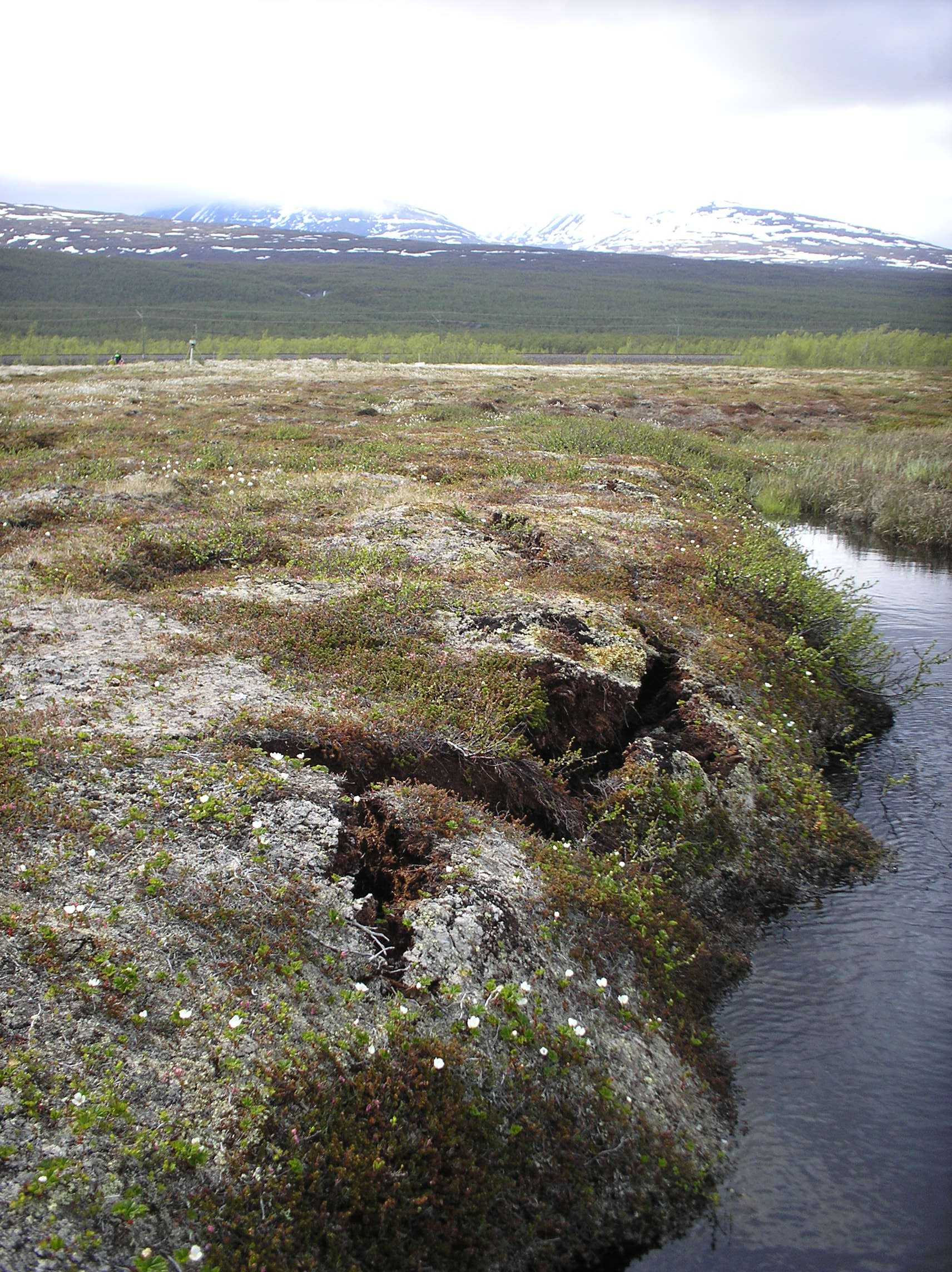
The Storflaket peat bog near Abisko in northern Sweden is a permafrost plateau. It shows some signs of collapse such as cracks at its borders.

One specific type of mire at which palsa structures appear is called a palsa mire. But, sometimes the nature type is described as palsa bogs, however, they both refer to a peaty wetland where palsa mounds occur. In palsa mires, palsas which are in different stages of development can appear due to the cyclic development of the structure. Therefore, the collapsed form of the palsas are common in these areas which can be seen as rounded ponds, open peat surfaces or low circular rim ridges.

The individual palsa is described as a mound or a larger elevation in peatland with a core of permanently frozen peat and/or mineral soil with an uppermost active layer of peat. The landform occurs in areas with discontinuous permafrost. The core of palsas stays frozen permanently, including summertime, as the peat layer creates an insulating effect. Mostly palsas have an oval or elongated form but different shapes of palsas have been described. In some places (Laivadalen and Keinovuopio in northern Sweden), palsa complexes which consist of several dome-shaped palsas have been found. At other places (Seitajaure in northern Sweden), another palsa structure is described. Here several palsa-plateaus have been found which have flatter surfaces and steep edges.

Palsa forms include mounds, plateaus and ridges of different sizes. Palsas in Iceland have been described as hump-shaped, dike-shaped, plateau-shaped, ring-shaped, and shield-shaped. Those in Norway have been referred to as palsa plateaus, esker palsas, string palsas, conical or dome-shaped palsas, and palsa complexes.

Widths are commonly 10–30 m (33–98 ft), and lengths 15–150 m (49–490 ft). However, lengths of up to 500 m (1,600 ft) have been reported for esker-like palsa ridges running parallel to the gradient of a bog. Heights range from less than 1 m (3 ft 3 in) up to 6–7 m (20–23 ft), but can reach about 10 m (33 ft) at a maximum above the surrounding area. Large forms tend to be considerably less conical than small ones. In places, palsas combine to form complexes several hundred meters in extent. The permafrost core contains ice lenses no thicker than 2–3 cm (0.79–1.2 in), though locally lenses up to almost 40 cm (16 in) thick have been described.

During the cyclic development, the palsa goes through several stages at which the morphology differs. In the initial aggrading stage of development, the palsas have smooth surfaces with no cracks in the peat layer and no visible signs of erosion can be seen. They are often small and dome-shaped and often referred to as embryo palsas. In this stage ice layers are created which are commonly found in the frozen peat core. It has been suggested that these ice layers are created by ice segregation but, it is most certainly buoyancy that is the reason for the formation of the ice layers. Buoyant rise of the core occurs which freezes when the permafrost reaches the area and creates the ice layers. In the stable, mature phase, the surface has risen further to a level at which the snow cover during winter is thinned by the wind which in turn makes it possible for deeper freezing. In the mature stage, the frozen core has reached beyond the peat layer into the underlying silty sediments and during summer thawing of the core occurs but not to an extent where the core thaws completely. The thawing can sometimes create water filled ponds adjacent to the palsa and in some cases, cracks in the peat layer along these ponds can be present in the stable stage. However, these cracks are small in size and no visible signs of block erosion are seen during the sable stage. During the degrading stage, however, the palsas have large cracks up to several meters which divide the peat layer into blocks and so-called block erosion occurs. Adjacent to palsas in the degrading stage often several individual ponds are found, due to thawing of the frozen core. Wind erosion often affect the peat layer to such a degree that it decreases in thickness with sometimes several decimeters. When palsa plateaus are in the degrading stage several ponds on the flat plateau-surface can be seen which often have neighbouring block erosion. When block erosion occurs the mineral soil is often exposed along the cracks, especially when the peat layer is thin.

== Geographic distribution ==
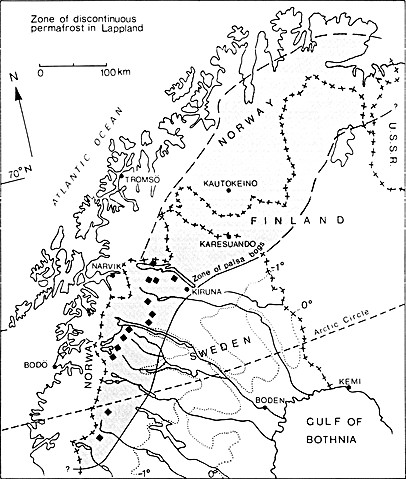
Anders Rapp's map of the limit of palsas and discontinuous permafrost in Fennoscandia

Palsas are typical forms of the discontinuous permafrost zone regions and are therefore found in Subarctic regions of northern Canada and Alaska, Siberia, northern Fennoscandia and Iceland. They are almost exclusively associated with the presence of peat and commonly occur in areas where the winters are long and the snow cover tends to be thin. In some places palsas extend into underlying permafrost; in others they rest on an unfrozen substratum.

In the Southern Hemisphere palsa remains from the Last Glacial Maximum have been identified on the Argentine side of Isla Grande de Tierra del Fuego just north of Cami Lake. Remainders of Ice-Age palsas are to be found also in Hochmooren of Central Europe, such as Hohen Venn in the German-Belgian border area.

== Effects of climate change ==
=== Effect on palsa forms due to change in climatic conditions ===
Erosion of palsa forms and the receding of the permafrost in the core of the palsa does not directly indicate a change in climatic conditions. As the palsas have a cyclic development the thawing of the core is a normal part of the palsa development. However, change in climatic conditions does affect palsa forms. The palsa forms that lay in the outskirt of the occurrence area are more dependent on climatic conditions for existence than the palsa forms near the core of the occurrence area. A study on palsa forms was done in 1998 at Dovrefjell, in southern Norway. At the time of observation, the mean annual temperature lied just under 0 °C (32 °F) in the area. These areas are certainly sensitive to changes in temperature; just a small temperature rise can have a great effect on the lasting existence of palsas in the specific region. Measurements from meteorological stations in the area show that the mean annual temperature rose 0.8 °C between the time periods of 1901–1930 and 1961–1990. Since the start of the warming trend in the 1930s, entire palsa bogs and large palsa plateaus have completely melted in the Dovrefjell area. Palsa bogs' sensitivity to changes in temperature makes them a good climate indicator. The study in the Dovrefjell area concluded that if palsas are used as climate indicators it is essential to separate large changes in the distribution of permafrost from smaller changes. Smaller changes are caused by shorter climatic variations which only last a few years. Small dome palsas, which also can be called embryo palsas, can develop as a result of smaller variations in climatic conditions such as a few following cold winters. As these small palsas disappear after just a few years, they fail to establish as permanent formations. This phenomenon has been observed in the Dovrefjell in the last decades and is caused by a larger change in the climatic condition where the temperature has risen to a level at which the palsas cannot fully initiate their cyclic development. This is a consequence of climate change with the warming trend which has been observed in the Dovrefjell area. In this area, the climate has not been cold enough for new palsa forms to establish during the whole of the 20th century.

However, some uncertainties of how the local conditions affect the formation of palsa forms and especially the hydrology of palsa mires still exist. Additionally, more active-layer monitoring and its correlation to local weather conditions is needed to better determine the effect of climate change on palsa mires.

=== Palsa and GHG-fluxes ===
Because the top mounds of the palsas are more dry and nutrient poor than their wet surroundings, they create a mosaic of microhabitats within the mire. The occurrence of a palsa is determined by several climatological factors, such as air temperature, precipitation and snow thickness. Therefore, an increase in temperature and precipitation may induce thawing of frozen peat and subsidence of the peat surface. This results in a thicker active layer and wetter conditions. The vegetation, therefore, changes in adaptation to the wetter conditions. The expanding wetness is projected to benefit sphagnum mosses and graminoids, at the expense of the dryer palsa vegetation. The associated changes in greenhouse gases fluxes are increased CO_{2} uptake and increased methane emission, mainly due to the expansion of tall graminoids.

=== The continued occurrence of palsa mires in Fennoscandia ===
The lasting occurrence of palsa mires is endangered by several factors. Foremost of these is climate change, with palsa mires located on the margins of their climatic distribution being the most vulnerable. Climate change causes an increase in the average annual temperature, which must lay under 0 °C (32 °F) for palsas to persist. Palsas also generally require relatively low precipitation (generally < 500 mm annually), and increases in precipitation due to climate change may result in palsa degradation and thaw. Increases in snowfall can mean that the palsas are more insulated and therefore do not get as cold in winter. Conversely, increased rainfall in the summer months can result in higher ground thermal conductivities and greater heat transfer to the palsa core. The effects are already visible: many studies report degradation of palsa mires during the last decades with the primary cause for the loss of habitat area being climate change. Climate envelope models have been used to predict the future distribution of palsas under different climate change scenarios: one such study found that Fennoscandia is likely to become climatically unsuitable for palsas by 2040, and that strong mitigation (SSP1-2.6) is required to retain a significant suitable area for palsas in Western Siberia.

Another factor is particles from atmospheric fallout which can influence the hydrochemistry and degradation rate of organic matter. Furthermore, community building and primarily such that have an impact on the hydrology and hydrochemistry can damage the habitat of palsa mires. But, the impact from this kind of activity is minimal considering the extent of the occurrence area which is relatively large compared to the impacted area. Palsa mires are a prioritized habitat type in EU's Species and Habitats Directive and therefore conservation of palsa mires within Sweden and Finland is of great interest. Conservation of this habitat can be fulfilled with measures of such kind that they sustain a favourable conservation status and degradation of the palsa mires are avoided. But in 2013 Sweden reported the conservation status for the palsa mires to be poor and in many areas the palsas have collapsed and there is a high risk for extinction.

=== Effects on ecosystems and species ===
A typical palsa mire has a high level of biodiversity, ranging from several different types of bird species to tiny organisms like bacteria. This is largely because of particularly due to its outstanding minerotrophic-ombrotrophic and water table gradients, which enables the presence of several microhabitats distributed in different degrees of wetness. Palsa mires are listed as a priority habitat type by the European Union, and climate change may pose a great risk to its ecosystems. Although much research has been carried out on degradation of palsa mires, there is still an enormous information gap on what implications on biodiversity disruptions in ecosystems may have. In fact, there is not much at all known about many organisms inhabiting palsas. It is vital to gain more knowledge about the distribution of these organisms, as well as patterns of species richness long-term, in order to understand and predict possible implications of potential loss of palsa. Without this key knowledge, understanding the biological importance of palsa mires is hard to assess.

In palsa mire zones in Northern Europe, abundance of bird species breeding finds it peak. This is particularly true in the case of North European waders. In the northernmost of Finland, palsa mires host the highest bird species density of all compared to several different biotopes, and there are most likely the heterogeneity of habitats and availability of shallow waters (a basic source of food) that creates such a massive diversity of birds. Due to likely loss of palsa mires in this century, effects on wildlife and biodiversity is undeniable. Shallow waters might disappear or decrease dramatically, creating a more homogenous environment. This will likely have a negative impact on certain species of breeding birds as well as other organisms inhabiting palsa mires permanently or seasonally.

The available research on ecological effects of palsa regression is scarce. As many breeding species are not exclusive to palsa mires, the question of possible extinction as a result of declining palsa mires are yet not certain. It is not a reach though, to suggest that the homogenization of palsa mires will bring biological consequences. There are some (however few) studies conducted on the ecological factors responsible for species abundance, in which water table depth is a suggested factor. To successfully conduct a comprehensive study on biodiversity effects in this area, much more research is needed to map out a lot of species living in palsa areas.

== Differences and commonalities between pingos and palsas ==
Both palsas and pingos are perennial frost mounds; however, pingos are typically larger than palsas and can reach heights greater than 50 m, while the highest palsas rarely exceed 7–10 m. More importantly, palsas do not have an intrusive ice core, or ice that forms as a result of local groundwater. However, for pingos, the defining characteristic is the presence of intrusive ice throughout most of the core. Palsas form as a result of ice-lens accumulation by cryosuction, and pingos as the result of hydraulic pressure if it is open, and hydrostatic pressure if it is closed.

Moreover, contrary to pingos which are usually isolated, palsas usually arise in groups with other palsas, such as in a so-called palsa bog. Unlike pingos, palsas do not require surrounding permafrost to grow, seeing as palsa are permafrost. Pingos also grow below the active layer, which is the depth that the annual freeze-thaw cycle occurs, and palsas grow in the active layer.

Both palsas and pingos result from freezing of water to an ice core. Palsas, however, do not necessarily require positive hydrostatic pressure (to inject water), since the boggy soil is water-saturated and therefore has sufficient supply for the growing ice core.

Palsas can grow laterally to a wide extent forming a "palsa plateau", also known as a "permafrost plateau". Pingos do not grow laterally to the same extent because the growth of pingos is chiefly upward; thus they are always hills. Similarly, palsas can laterally decrease in size while maintaining their height; the decay of pingos follows a different pattern.

== Terminology and synonyms ==
Palsa (plural: palsas) is a term from the Finnish language meaning "a hummock rising out of a bog with a core of ice", which in turn is a borrowing from Northern Sami, balsa. As palsas particularly develop in moorlands, they are therefore also named palsamoors. Bugor and bulginniakhs are general terms in the Russian language (the latter of Yakutian origin) for both palsas and pingos.
