= Methylocapsa =

Scientific classification
- Domain: Bacteria
- Kingdom: Pseudomonadati
- Phylum: Pseudomonadota
- Class: Alphaproteobacteria
- Order: Hyphomicrobiales
- Family: Beijerinckiaceae
- Genus: Methylocapsa; Dedysh et al. 2002

Type species
- Methylocapsa acidiphila

Species
- Methylocapsa acidiphila; Methylocapsa aurea; Methylocapsa gorgona; Methylocapsa palsarum

Genus of bacteria

Methylocapsa is a genus of bacteria from the family Beijerinckiaceae. M. gorgona has been shown to metabolize significant amounts of atmospheric methane.
