= Frost law =

Weather-related road-traffic restrictions

Frost laws are seasonal restrictions on traffic weight limits and speeds on roadways subject to thaw weakening.

In climates that experience below-freezing temperatures, damage to roads from thaw-weakening have led to many US states, Canadian provinces and other jurisdictions to enact laws that restrict vehicle loads during spring months, when road structures are thawing from above in a manner that limits water from escaping the soil structure, thereby weakening the pavement underpinnings. The US state of Michigan, for example, during the months of March, April and May reduce legal axle weights of vehicles by up to 35%. Some areas also require heavy vehicles to travel a maximum of 35 miles per hour (56 km/h), regardless of the posted limit. Some states allow load increases on roads during the freezing season.

== See also ==
- Frost heaving – Upwards swelling of soil during freezing
