= Beijerinckia =

Scientific classification
- Domain: Bacteria
- Kingdom: Pseudomonadati
- Phylum: Pseudomonadota
- Class: Alphaproteobacteria
- Order: Hyphomicrobiales
- Family: Beijerinckiaceae
- Genus: Beijerinckia; Derx 1950

Type species
- Beijerinckia indica

Species
- Beijerinckia derxii; Beijerinckia doebereinerae; Beijerinckia indica; Beijerinckia mobilis

Genus of bacteria

Beijerinckia is a genus of bacteria from the family Beijerinckiaceae.

Beijerinckia is a free living nitrogen-fixing aerobic microbe. It has abundant of nitrogenase enzyme capable of nitrogen reduction.Beijerinckia are characterized as nonsymbiotic (i.e., free-living), aerobic, chemoheterorophic bacteria with the ability to fix atmospheric nitrogen. They can be distinguished from other nitrogen-fixing bacteria by cell morphology and some physiological characteristics.

Beijerinckia is named after M.W. Beijerinck, the Dutch microbiologist (1851–1931).
