= Methylovirgula =

Scientific classification
- Domain: Bacteria
- Kingdom: Pseudomonadati
- Phylum: Pseudomonadota
- Class: Alphaproteobacteria
- Order: Hyphomicrobiales
- Family: Beijerinckiaceae
- Genus: Methylovirgula; Vorob'ev et al. 2009

Type species
- Methylovirgula ligni

Species
- M. ligni

Genus of bacteria

Methylovirgula is a Gram-negative, aerobic genus of bacteria from the family of Beijerinckiaceae.
