= Pseudochelatococcus =

Scientific classification
- Domain: Bacteria
- Kingdom: Pseudomonadati
- Phylum: Pseudomonadota
- Class: Alphaproteobacteria
- Order: Hyphomicrobiales
- Family: Beijerinckiaceae
- Genus: Pseudochelatococcus; Kämpfer et al. 2015

Type species
- Pseudochelatococcus contaminans Kämpfer et al. 2015

Species
- P. contaminans Kämpfer et al. 2015; P. lubricantis Kämpfer et al. 2015

Synonyms
- Qingshengfania Zhang et al. 2015

Genus of bacteria

Pseudochelatococcus is a genus of bacteria from the family Beijerinckiaceae.
