= Methyloferula =

Scientific classification
- Domain: Bacteria
- Kingdom: Pseudomonadati
- Phylum: Pseudomonadota
- Class: Alphaproteobacteria
- Order: Hyphomicrobiales
- Family: Beijerinckiaceae
- Genus: Methyloferula; Vorobev et al. 2011

Type species
- Methyloferula stellata

Species
- M. stellata

Genus of bacteria

Methyloferula is a Gram-negative, mesophilic, psychrotolerant, aerobic and colorless genus of bacteria from the family of Beijerinckiaceae. Up to now there is only one species of this genus known (Methyloferula stellata).
