= Methylorosula =

Scientific classification
- Domain: Bacteria
- Kingdom: Pseudomonadati
- Phylum: Pseudomonadota
- Class: Alphaproteobacteria
- Order: Hyphomicrobiales
- Family: Beijerinckiaceae
- Genus: Methylorosula; Berestovskaya et al. 2012

Type species
- Methylorosula polaris

Species
- M. polaris

Genus of bacteria

Methylorosula is a Gram-negative genus of bacteria from the family of Beijerinckiaceae, with one known species (Methylorosula polaris).
