= Ice lens =

Ice within soil or rock

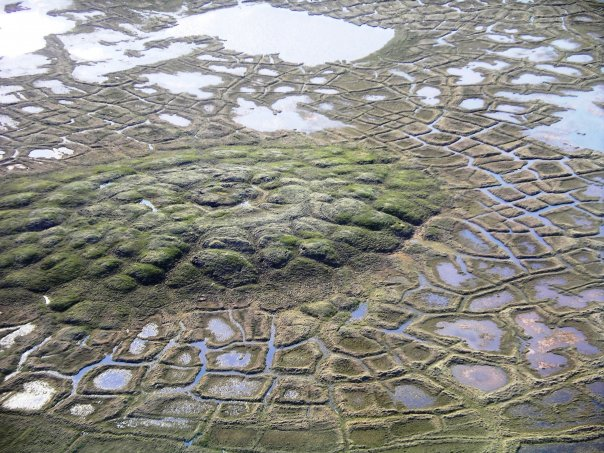
Pingo formed in arctic tundra as a result of periodically spaced ice lens formation.

Ice lenses are bodies of ice formed when moisture, diffused within soil or rock, accumulates in a localized zone. The ice initially accumulates within small collocated pores or pre-existing crack, and, as long as the conditions remain favorable, continues to collect in the ice layer or ice lens, wedging the soil or rock apart. Ice lenses grow parallel to the surface and several centimeters to several decimeters (inches to feet) deep in the soil or rock. Studies from 1990 have demonstrated that rock fracture by ice segregation (i.e., the fracture of intact rock by ice lenses that grow by drawing water from their surroundings during periods of sustained subfreezing temperatures) is a more effective weathering process than the freeze-thaw process which older texts proposed.

Ice lenses play a key role in frost induced heaving of soils and fracture of bedrock, which are fundamental to weathering in cold regions. Frost heaving creates debris and dramatically shapes landscapes into complex patterns. Although rock fracture in periglacial regions (alpine, subpolar and polar) has often been attributed to the freezing and volumetric expansion of water trapped within pores and cracks, the majority of frost heaving and of bedrock fracture results instead from ice segregation and lens growth in the near-surface frozen regions. Ice segregation results in rock fracture and frost heave.

== Description of the phenomena ==
=== Common frost heaving ===
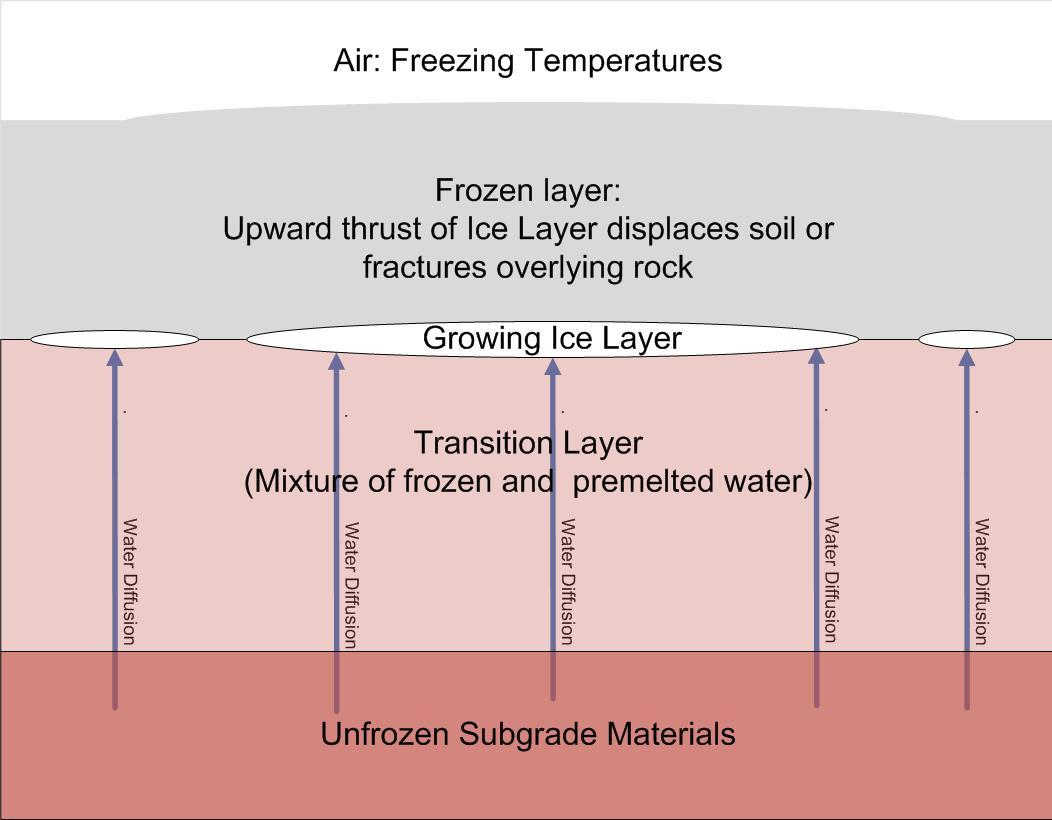
Ice lens formation resulting in frost heave in cold climates.

Frost heave is the process by which the freezing of water-saturated soil causes the deformation and upward thrust of the ground surface. This process can distort and crack pavement, damage the foundations of buildings and displace soil in regular patterns. Moist, fine-grained soil at certain temperatures is most susceptible to frost heaving.

=== Ice lenses in tundra ===
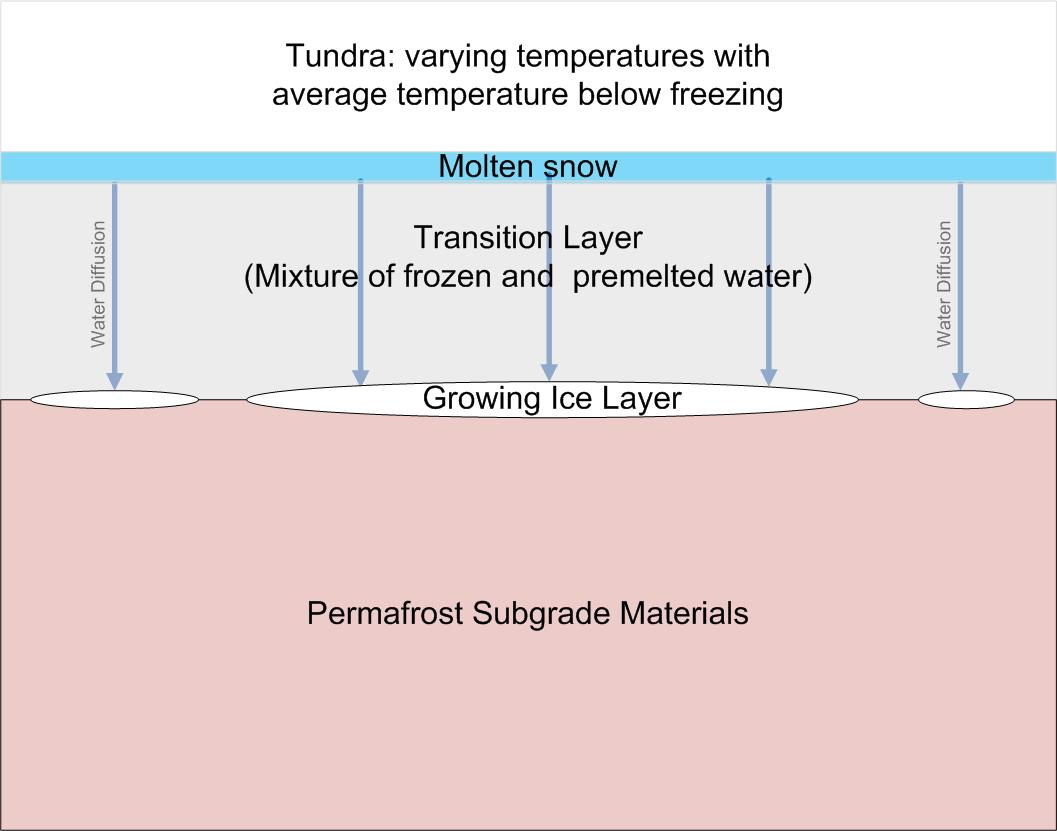
Ice lens formation within tundra.

Frost heave is common in arctic tundra because the permafrost maintains ground frozen at depth and prevents snowmelt and rain from draining. As a result, conditions are optimal for deep ice lens formation with large ice accumulations and significant soil displacement.

Differential frost heave producing complex patterns will occur if the correct conditions exist. Feedback from one year's frost heave influences the effects in subsequent years. For example, a small increase in overburden will affect the depth of ice formation and heaving in the subsequent years. Time-dependent models of the frost heave indicate that over a long enough period the short-separation perturbations damp out, while mid-range perturbations grow and come to dominate the landscape.

=== Subglacial ice formations ===
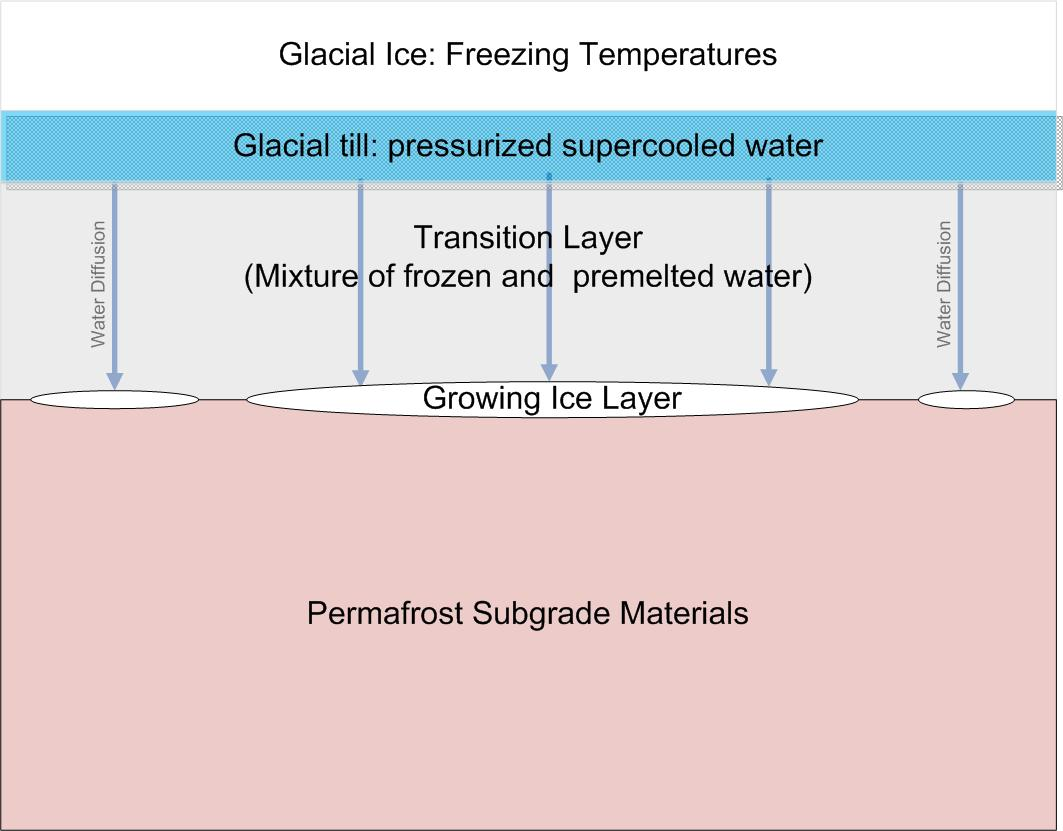
Ice lens growing within glacial till and bedrock beneath glacial ice.

Bands of sediment or glacial till have been observed below Antarctic ice sheets; these are believed to result from ice lenses forming in the debris. In the faster flowing glacial regions, the ice sheet is sliding over water saturated sediments (glacial till) or actually being floated upon a layer of water. The till and water served to reduce friction between the base of the ice sheet and the bedrock. These subglacial waters come from surface water which seasonally drains from melting at the surface, as well as from ice-sheet base melting.

Ice lens growth within the bedrock below the glacier is projected during the summer months when there is ample water at the base of the glacier. Ice lenses will form within the bedrock, accumulating until the rock is sufficiently weakened that it shears or spalls off. Layers of rock along the interface between glaciers and the bedrock are freed, producing much of the sediments in these basal regions of glaciers. Since the rate of glacier movement is dependent upon the characteristics of this basal ice, research is ongoing to better quantify the phenomena.

== Understanding the phenomena ==
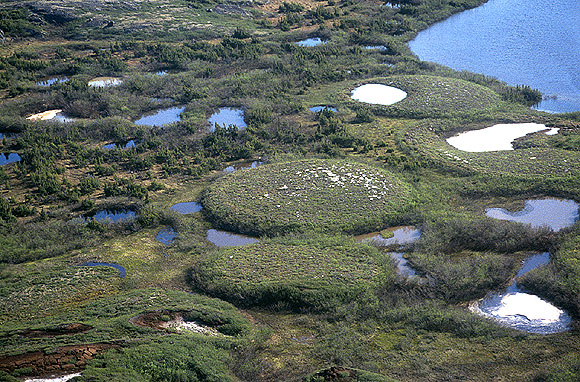
Ice lenses are responsible for palsa (picture) growth

The basic condition for ice segregation and frost heaving is existence of a region in soil or porous rock which is relatively permeable, is in a temperature range which allows the coexistence of ice and water (in a premelted state), and has a temperature gradient across the region.

A key phenomenon for understanding ice segregation in soil or porous rock (also referred to as an ice lens due to its shape) is premelting, which is the development of a liquid film on surfaces and interfaces at temperatures significantly below their bulk melting temperature. The term premelting is used to describe the reduction in the melting temperature (below 0 °C) which results from the surface curvature of water that's confined in a porous medium (the Gibbs-Thomson effect). Premelted water exists as a thin layer on the surface of ice. Under premelting conditions, ice and water can coexist at temperatures below -10 °C in a porous medium. The Gibbs-Thomson effect results in water migrating down a thermal gradient (from higher temperatures to lower temperatures); Dash states, "…material is carried to colder regions…" This can also be viewed energetically as favoring larger ice particles over smaller (Ostwald ripening). As a result, when conditions exist for ice segregation (ice lens formation) water flows toward the segregated ice and freezes on the surface, thickening the segregated ice layer.

It is possible to develop analytic models using these principles; they predict the following characteristics, which are consistent with field observations:

- Ice forms in layers which are parallel to the overlying surface.
- The ice initially forms with small microfractures parallel to the surface. As ice accumulates the ice layer grows outward in what is frequently characterized as an ice-lens parallel to the surface.
- Ice will form in water-permeable rock in much the same way as it forms in soil.
- If the ice layer resulted from a cooling from a single direction (e.g., the top) the fracture tends to lie close to the surface (e.g., 1–2 cm in chalk). If the ice layer results from freezing from both sides (e.g., above and below) the fracture tends to lie deeper (e.g., 2–3.5 cm in chalk).
- Ice forms rapidly when liquid is readily available. When liquid is readily available, the segregated ice (ice lens) grows parallel to the exposed cold surface. It grows rapidly until the heat liberated by freezing warms the ice lens boundary, reducing the temperature gradient and controlling the rate of further ice segregation. Under these conditions, ice grows in a single layer which gets progressively thicker. The surface is displaced and soil repositioned or rock fractured.
- Ice forms in a different pattern when liquid is less readily available. When liquid is not readily available, the segregated ice (ice lens) grows slowly. The heat liberated by freezing is unable to warm the ice lens boundary. Hence the area through which the water is diffusing continues to cool until another ice segregation layer forms below the first layer. With sustained cold weather, this process can repeat, producing multiple ice layers (ice lenses), all parallel to the surface. The formation of multiple layers (multiple lenses) producing more extensive frost damage within rocks or soils.
- No ice forms under some conditions. At higher overburden pressures and at relatively warm surface temperatures, ice segregation cannot occur; the liquid present freezes within the pore space, with no bulk ice segregation and no measurable surface deformation or frost damage.

== Ice lens growth in rock ==
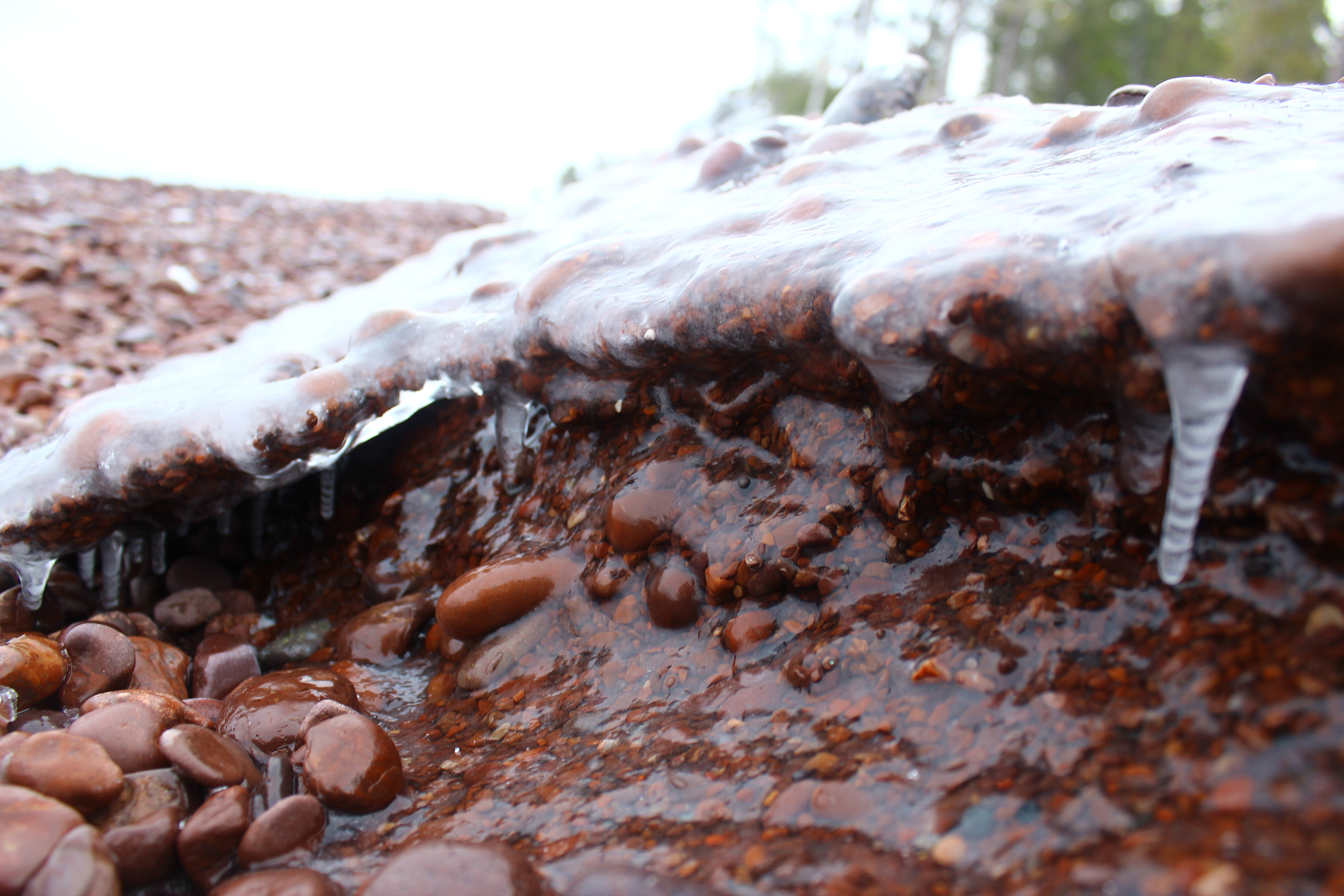
Ice Formation on coarse shore of Copper Harbor, Upper Peninsula Michigan.

Rocks routinely contain pores of varying size and shape, regardless of origin or location. Rock voids are essentially small cracks, and serve as the location from which a crack can propagate if the rock is placed in tension. If ice accumulates in a pore asymmetrically, the ice will place the rock in tension in a plane perpendicular to the ice accumulation direction. Hence the rock will crack along a plane perpendicular to the direction of ice accumulation, which is effectively parallel to the surface.

Walder and Hallet developed models that predict rock crack-growth locations and rates consistent with fractures actually observed in the field. Their model predicted that marble and granite grow cracks most effectively when the temperatures range from a −4 °C to −15 °C; in this range granite may develop fractures enclosing ice 3 meters in length in a year. When the temperature is higher the ice which is formed does not apply enough pressure to cause the crack to propagate. When the temperature is below this range the water is less mobile and cracks grow more slowly.

Mutron confirmed that ice initially forms in pores and creates small microfractures parallel to the surface. As ice accumulates, the ice layer grows outward in what is frequently characterized as an ice-lens parallel to the surface. Ice will form in water-permeable rock in much the same way as it forms in soil. If the ice layer resulted from cooling from a single direction (e.g., the top) the rock fracture tends to lie close to the surface (e.g., 1–2 cm in chalk). If the ice layer results from freezing from both sides (e.g., above and below) the rock fracture tends to lie deeper (e.g., 2–3.5 cm in chalk).

== Ice sphere formation ==
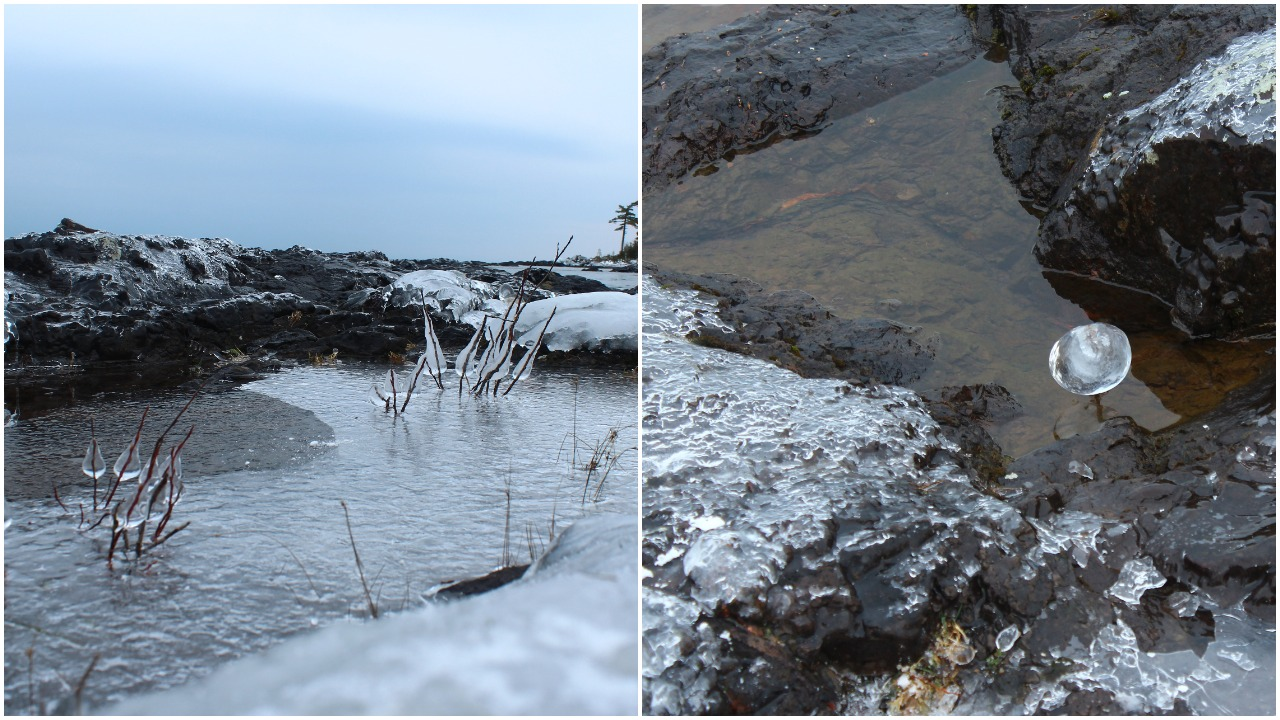
Suspended ice forms into a sphere or tear drop like shape after being repeatedly soaked by waves and frozen by surrounding air.

The formation of an ice sphere can happen when an object is about 0.5–1.0 ft above where the water reaches repeatedly. The water will form a thin layer of ice on any surface it reaches. Each wave is an advancement and recession of water. The advancement soaks everything on the shore. When the wave recedes, it's left exposed to freezing temperatures. This brief moment of exposure causes a thin layer of ice to form. When that formation is suspended in the air by dead vegetation or erect objects, the ice will begin to form a sphere or teardrop-like shape. Similar to how a condensation nucleus forms, the sphere needs a base that is not water. Most commonly on vegetation, the sphere starts as a dot of ice on a branch or stem. As waves soak the shore in water and briefly expose the soaked objects to freezing temperatures, the dot begins to grow as each thin layer wraps itself around the previous layer. Over time, they form spheres or teardrop-like formations
