= Lithalsa =

Frost-induced raised land form in permafrost areas

Lithalsa is a frost-induced raised land form in permafrost areas with mineral-rich soils, where a perennial ice lens has developed within the soil. The term sometimes also refers to palsas and pingos.
