= Patterned ground =

Geometric land forms

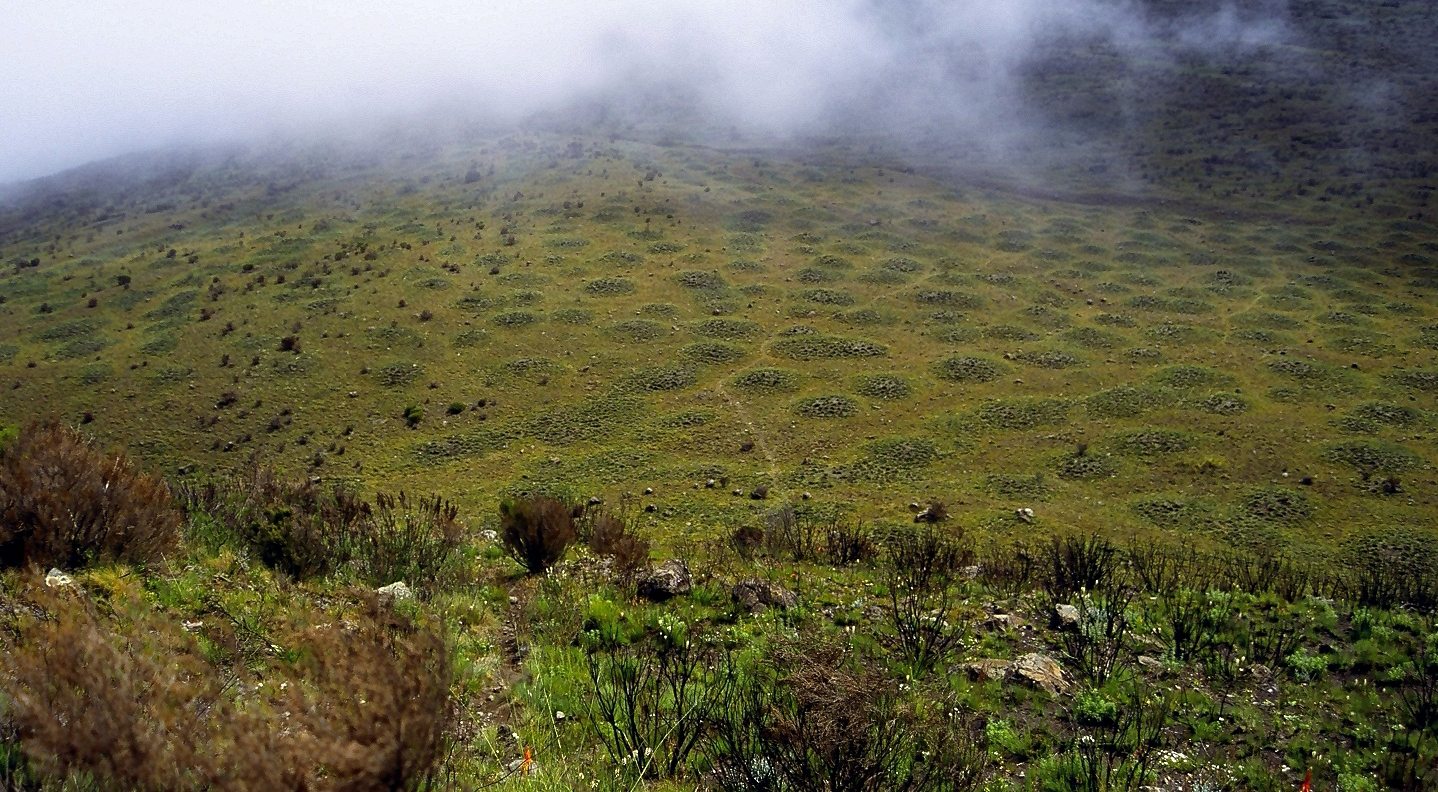
The patterned ground below Mugi Hill on Mount Kenya lies in an area of seasonal frost.

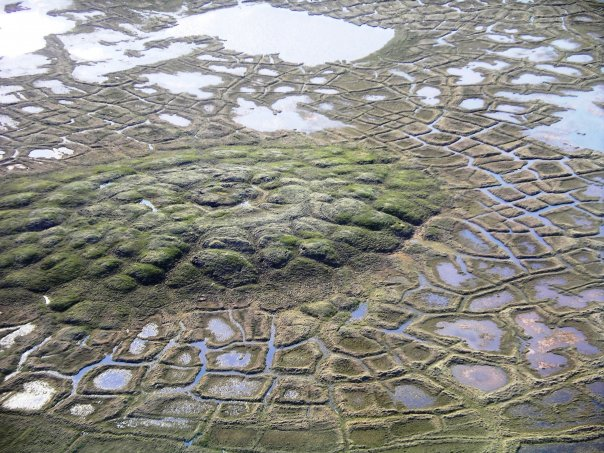
A pingo and polygonal ground near Tuktoyaktuk, Northwest Territories, Canada

Patterned ground is the distinct and often symmetrical natural pattern of geometric shapes formed by the deformation of ground material in periglacial regions. It is typically found in remote regions of the Arctic, Antarctica, and the Outback in Australia, but is also found anywhere that freezing and thawing of soil alternate; patterned ground has also been observed in the hyper-arid Atacama Desert and on Mars. The geometric shapes and patterns associated with patterned ground are often mistaken as artistic human creations. The mechanism of the formation of patterned ground had long puzzled scientists but the introduction of computer-generated geological models in the past 20 years has allowed scientists to relate it to frost heaving, the expansion that occurs when wet, fine-grained, and porous soils freeze.

== Types ==
Patterned ground can be found in a variety of forms. Typically, the type of patterned ground in a given area is related to the prevalence of larger stones in local soils and the frequency of freeze-thaw cycles.

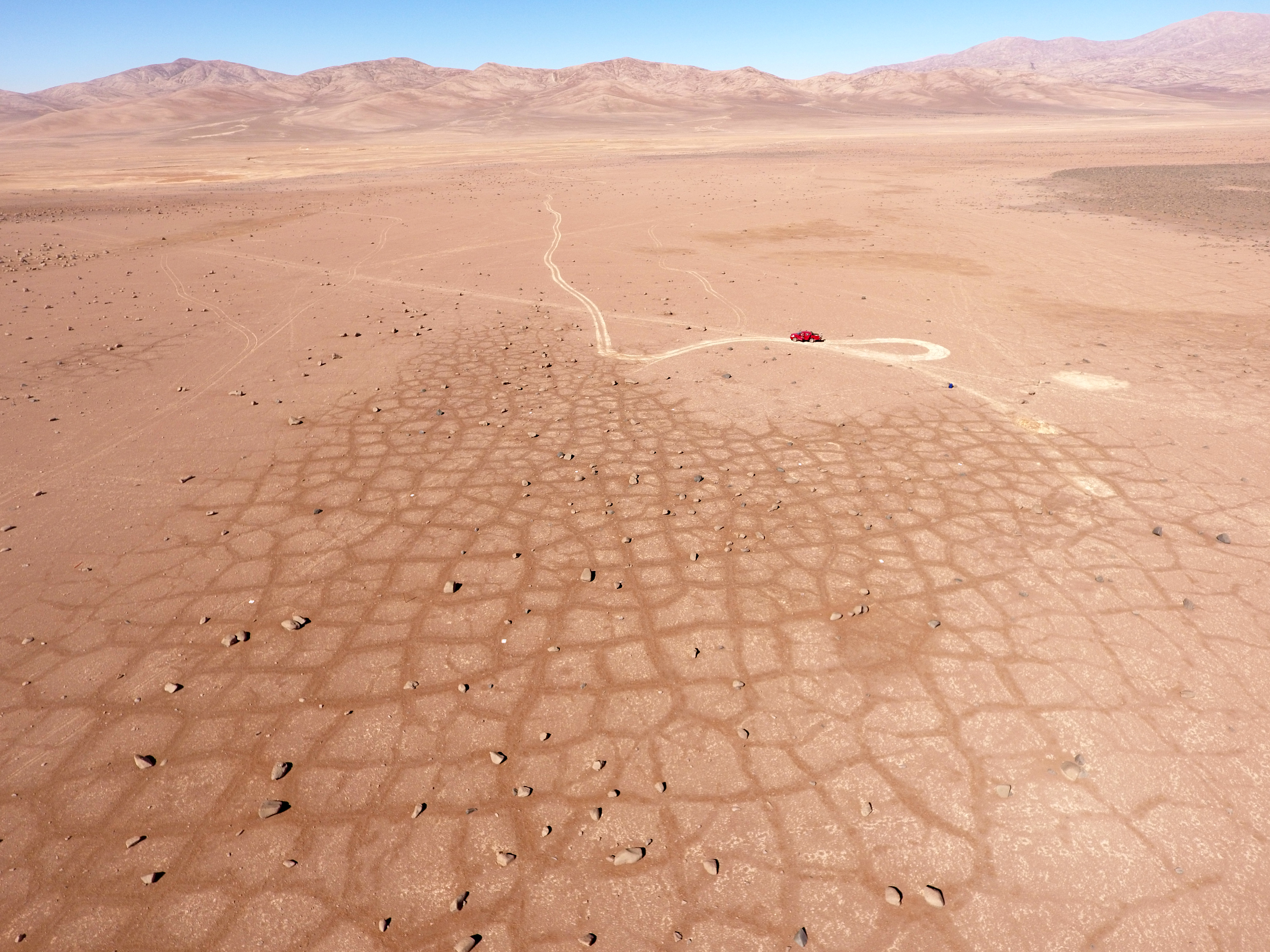
Patterned ground in the form of soil polygons located in the hyper-arid Atacama Desert

=== Polygons ===
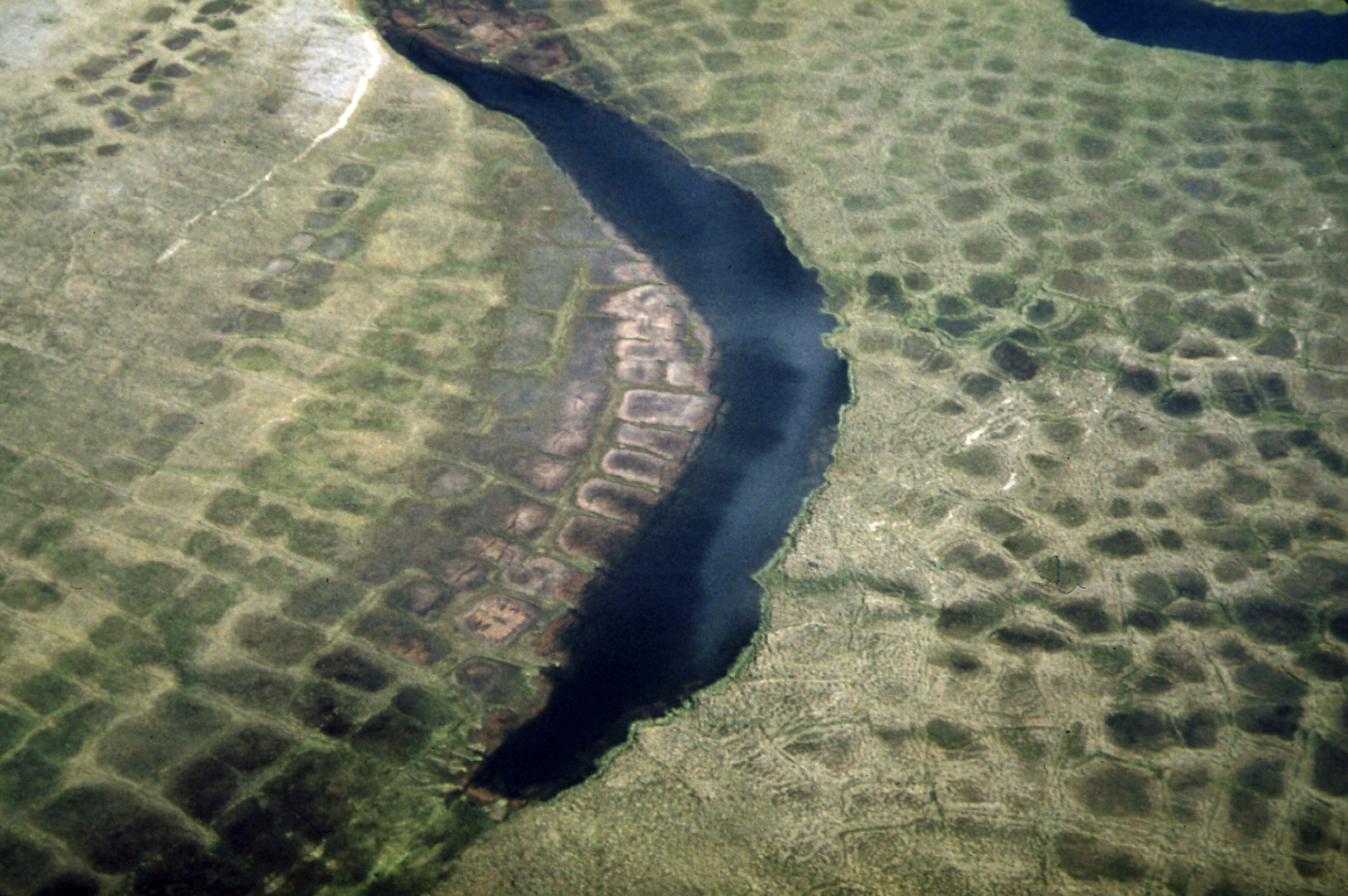
Polygonal soil patterns, typical of the Arctic Tundra

Polygons can form either in permafrost areas (as ice wedges) or in areas that are affected by seasonal frost. The rocks that make up these raised stone rings typically decrease in size with depth.

=== Circles ===
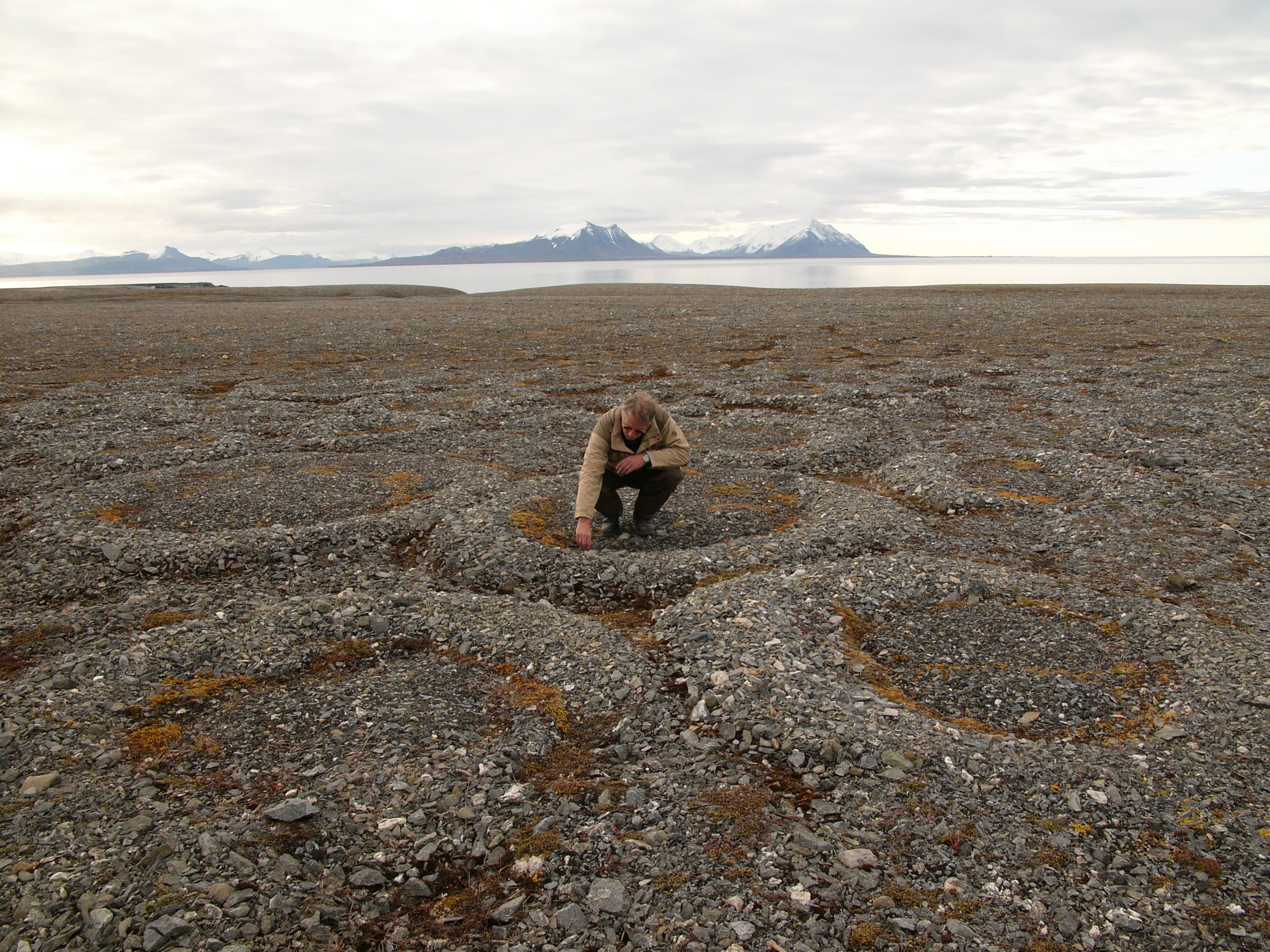
Partially melted and collapsed lithalsas (heaved mounds found in permafrost) have left circle-like structures on the Svalbard Archipelago.

Circles range in size from a few centimeters to several meters in diameter. Circles can consist of both sorted and unsorted material, and generally occur with fine sediments in the center surrounded by a circle of larger stones. Unsorted circles are similar, but rather than being surrounded by a circle of larger stones, they are bounded by a circular margin of vegetation.

=== Steps ===
Steps can be developed from circles and polygons. This form of patterned ground is generally a terrace-like feature that has a border of either larger stones or vegetation on the downslope side, and can consist of either sorted or unsorted material.

=== Stripes ===
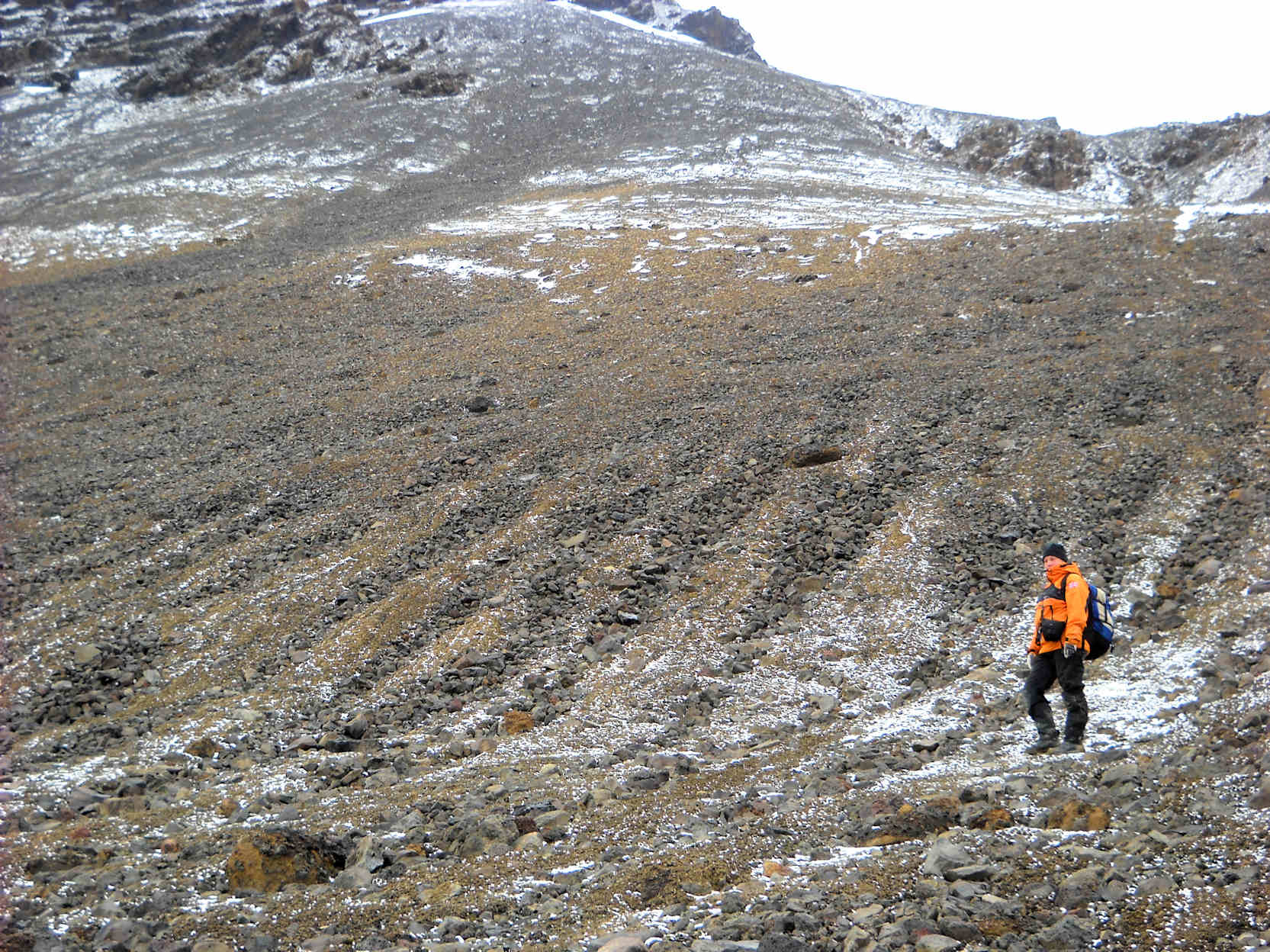
Periglacial stone stripes in Antarctica

Stripes are lines of stones, vegetation, and/or soil that typically form from transitioning steps on slopes at angles between 2° and 7°. Stripes can consist of either sorted or unsorted material. Sorted stripes are lines of larger stones separated by areas of smaller stones, fine sediment, or vegetation. Unsorted stripes typically consist of lines of vegetation or soil that are separated by bare ground.

It has been conjectured that periglacial stripes on Salisbury Plain in England, that happened by chance to align with the solar sunrise at mid summer and sun set at mid winter, gave rise to awe and veneration by prehistoric people that eventually culminated in the building of the Stonehenge.

== Formation ==
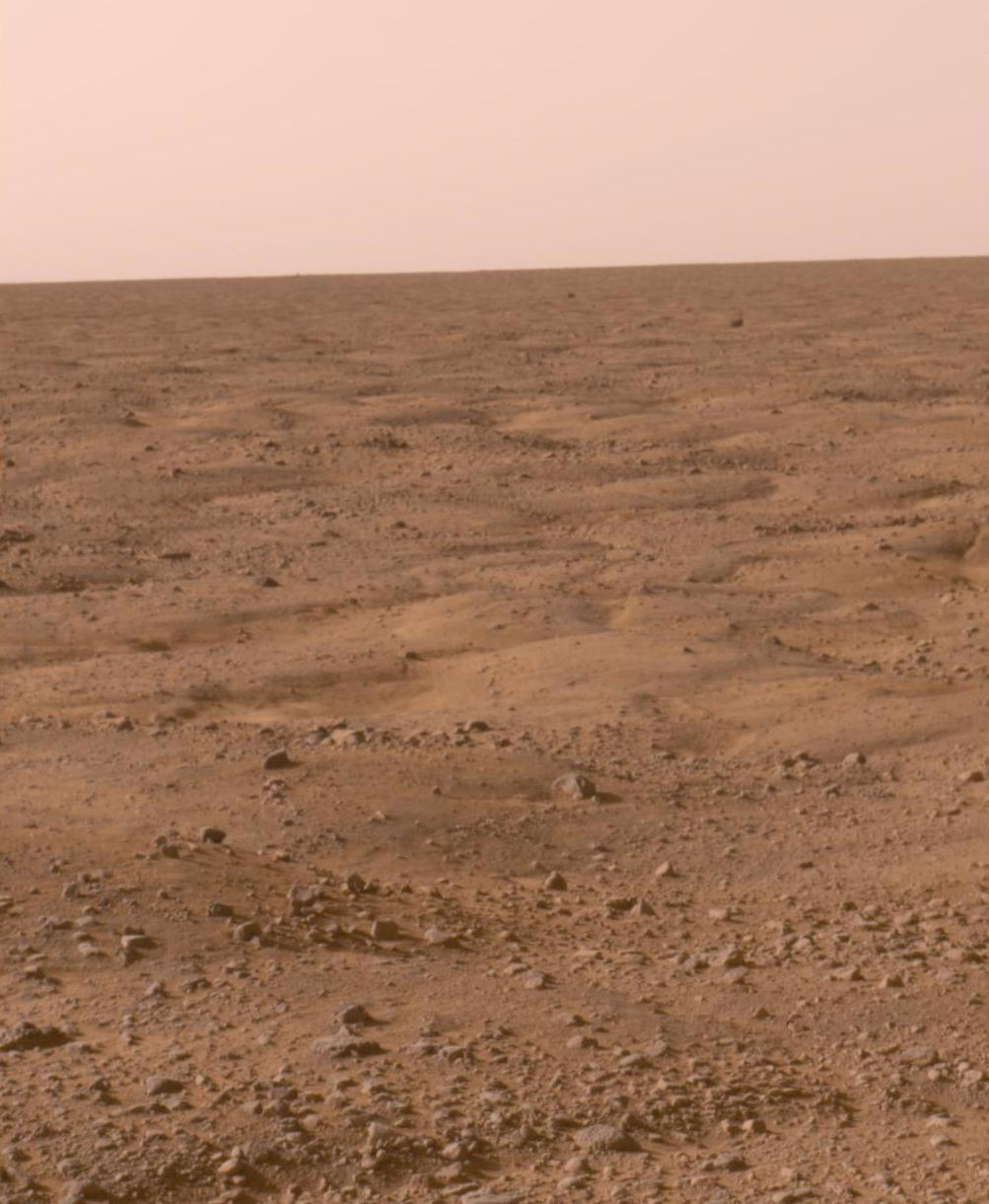
Patterned ground in the polar region of Mars

In periglacial areas and areas affected by seasonal frost, repeated freezing and thawing of groundwater forces larger stones toward the surface, as smaller stones flow and settle underneath larger stones. At the surface, areas that are rich in larger stones contain much less water than highly porous areas of finer grained sediments. These water-saturated areas of finer sediments have a much greater ability to expand and contract as freezing and thawing occur, leading to lateral forces which ultimately pile larger stones into clusters and stripes. Through time, repeated freeze-thaw cycles smooth out irregularities and odd-shaped piles to form the common polygons, circles, and stripes of patterned ground.

Patterned ground occurs in alpine areas with freeze thaw cycles. For example, on Mount Kenya seasonal frost layer is a few centimetres (inches) below the surface in places. Patterned ground is present at 3,400 metres (11,155 ft) to the west of Mugi Hill. These mounds grow because of the repeated freezing and thawing of the ground drawing in more water. There are blockfields present around 4,000 metres (13,123 ft) where the ground has cracked to form hexagons. Solifluction occurs when the night temperatures freeze the soil before it thaws again in the morning. This daily expansion and contraction of the soil prevents the establishment of vegetation.

Frost also sorts the sediments in the ground. Once the mantle has been weathered, finer particles tend to migrate away from the freezing front, and larger particles migrate through the action of gravity. Patterned ground forms mostly within the active layer of permafrost.

== See also ==
- Emergence – Unpredictable phenomenon in complex systems
- Glacier – Persistent body of ice that moves downhill under its own weight
- Ice field – Large area of interconnected glaciers
- Ice sheet – Large mass of glacial ice
- Mima mounds – Geological feature in Washington, United States
