= Cryosuction =

Cryosuction is the concept of negative pressure in freezing liquids so that more liquid is sucked into the freezing zone. In soil, the transformation of liquid water to ice in the soil pores causes water to migrate through soil pores to the freezing zone through capillary action.

== History of discovery ==
In 1930, Stephen Taber demonstrated that liquid water migrates towards the freeze line within soil. He showed that other liquids, such as benzene, which contracts when it freezes, also produce frost heave.

Fine-grained soils such as clays and silts enable greater negative pressures than more coarse-grained soils due to the smaller pore size. In periglacial environments, this mechanism is highly significant and it is the predominant process in ice lens formation in permafrost areas.

As of 2001, several models for ice-lens formation by cryosuction existed, among others the hydrodynamic model and the Premelting model, many of them based on the Clausius–Clapeyron relation with various assumptions, yielding cryosuction potentials of 11 to 12 atm per degree Celsius below zero depending on pore size.

In 2023, experiments from the ETH Zurich were published, in which the process could be observed between glass slides in a confocal microscope. In single-crystal experiments the rate of ice growth was slow, but with polycrystalline ice there were many more channels to suck in water to grow ice. How solutes in the water influence cryosuction is still unexplored.

== See also ==
- Pore water pressure
- Suction
