= Methylocella =

Scientific classification
- Domain: Bacteria
- Kingdom: Pseudomonadati
- Phylum: Pseudomonadota
- Class: Alphaproteobacteria
- Order: Hyphomicrobiales
- Family: Beijerinckiaceae
- Genus: Methylocella; Dedysh et al. 2000

Type species
- Methylocella palustris

Species
- Methylocella palustris Methylocella silvestris Methylocella tundrae

Genus of bacteria

Methylocella is a genus of bacteria from the family Beijerinckiaceae.
