= Frost heaving =

Upwards swelling of soil during freezing

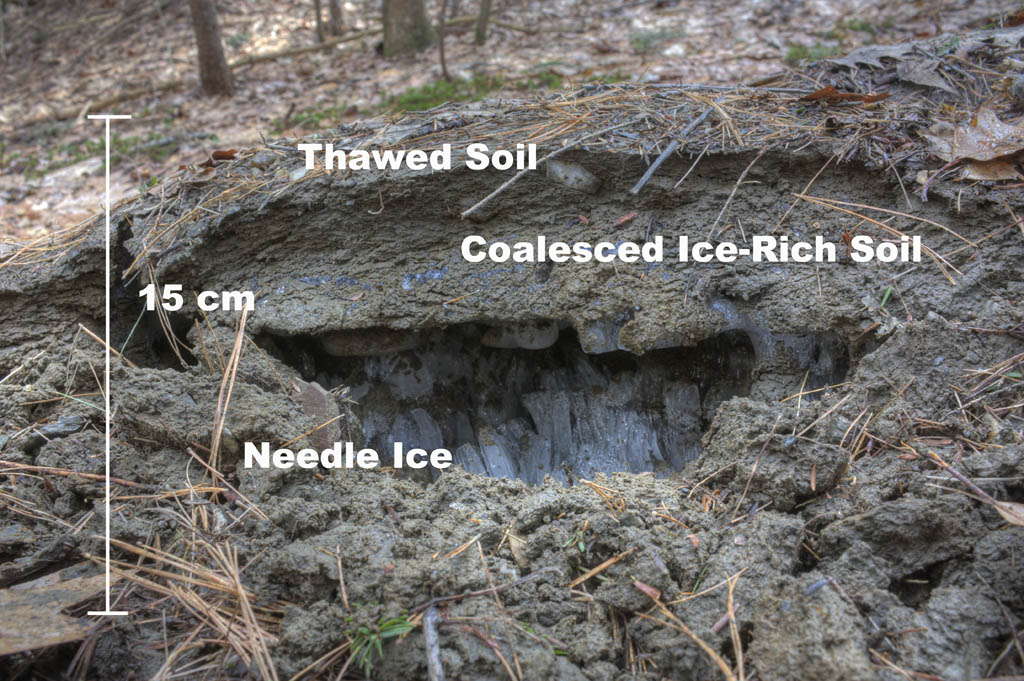
Anatomy of a frost heave during spring thaw. The side of a 6-inch (15-cm) heave with the soil removed to reveal (bottom to top): Needle ice, which has extruded up from the freezing front through porous soil from a water table below; Coalesced ice-rich soil, which has been subject to freeze-thaw; Thawed soil on top; Photograph taken 21 March 2010 in Norwich, Vermont

Frost heaving (or a frost heave) is an upwards swelling of soil during freezing conditions caused by an increasing presence of ice as it grows towards the surface, upwards from the depth in the soil where freezing temperatures have penetrated into the soil (the freezing front or freezing boundary). Ice growth requires a water supply that delivers water to the freezing front via capillary action in certain soils. The weight of overlying soil restrains vertical growth of the ice and can promote the formation of lens-shaped areas of ice within the soil. Yet the force of one or more growing ice lenses is sufficient to lift a layer of soil, as much as 1 foot (0.30 metres) or more. The soil through which water passes to feed the formation of ice lenses must be sufficiently porous to allow capillary action, yet not so porous as to break capillary continuity. Such soil is referred to as "frost susceptible". The growth of ice lenses continually consumes the rising water at the freezing front. Differential frost heaving can crack road surfaces—contributing to springtime pothole formation—and damage building foundations. Frost heaves may occur in mechanically refrigerated cold-storage buildings and ice rinks.

Needle ice is essentially frost heaving that occurs at the beginning of the freezing season, before the freezing front has penetrated very far into the soil and there is no soil overburden to lift as a frost heave.

== Mechanisms ==
=== Historical understanding of frost heaving ===
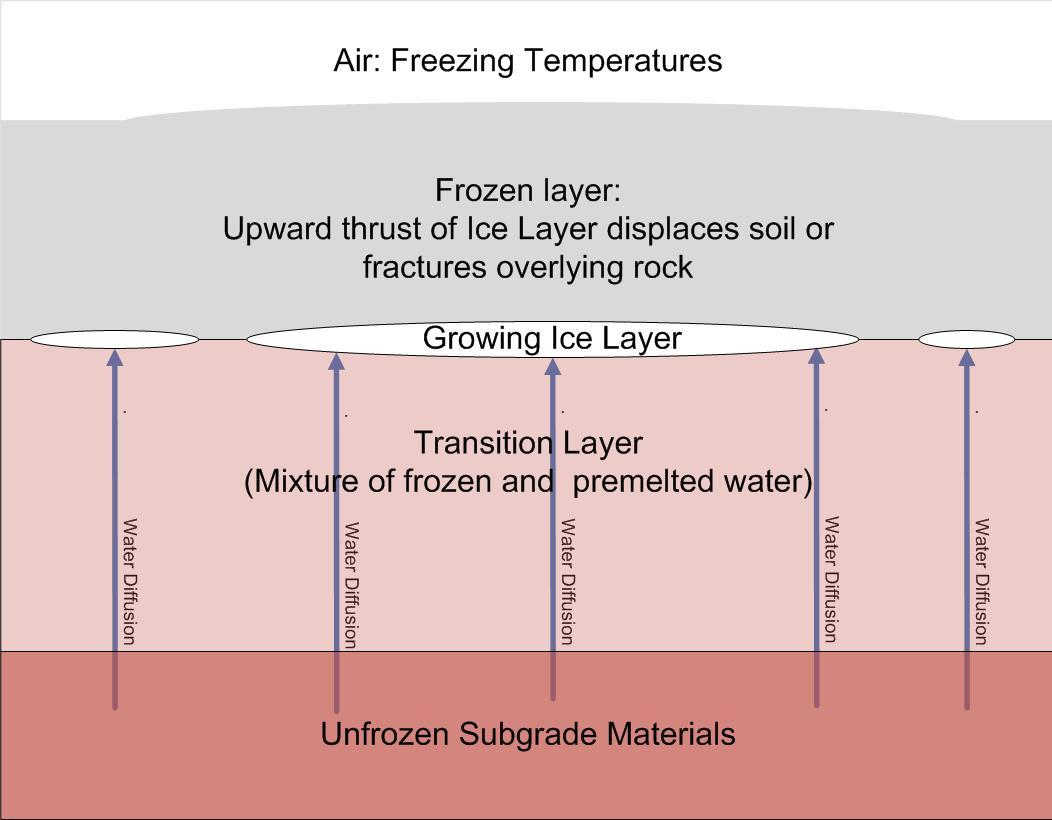
Ice lens formation resulting in frost heave in cold climates.

Urban Hjärne described frost effects in soil in 1694. (Note: In the section II. Fl. Om Jord och Landskap i gemeen (II. About the soil and the landscape in general) of his book, Hiärne mentions the phenomenon of "earth casting" or "earth heaving", in which, after the spring thaw, large chunks of sod appear to have been ripped from the ground and tossed: "3. Whether one sees in other places in Sweden, Finland and Iceland, etc., as has so happened in Uppland and in Närke in Viby parish, royal Vallby, that the earth itself with turf and all [in pieces] up to a few cubits long and wide has been thrown upwards which 20 or more men could not do, and a large pit is left afterwards." (3. Om man seer uti andre Orter i Swerige / Fin-Est och Lif-land / etc. så wara stedt / som hår i Upland / och i Nårike i Wijby Sochn / Kongz Wallby / at Jorden sig med Torff och all till någre Alnars Långd och bredd har opkastat det 20 eller flere Karlar teke hint göra / och en stoor Graff effter sig lemnat.) Urban Hjärne, Een kort Anledning till åtskillige Malm- och Bergarters, Mineraliers, Wäxters, och Jordeslags sampt flere sällsamme Tings, effterspöriande och angifwande [A brief guide to discovering and specifying various types of ores and mountains, minerals, plants, and soils, together with several unusual things] (Stockholm, Sweden: 1694). Available on-line at: National Library of Sweden.) By 1930, Stephen Taber, head of the Department of Geology at the University of South Carolina, had disproved the hypothesis that frost heaving results from molar volume expansion with freezing of water already present in the soil prior to the onset of subzero temperatures, i.e. with little contribution from the migration of water within the soil.

Since the molar volume of water expands by about 9% as it changes phase from water to ice at its bulk freezing point, 9% would be the maximum expansion possible owing to molar volume expansion, and even then only if the ice were rigidly constrained laterally in the soil so that the entire volume expansion had to occur vertically. Ice is unusual among compounds because it increases in molar volume from its liquid state, water. Most compounds decrease in volume when changing phase from liquid to solid. Taber showed that the vertical displacement of soil in frost heaving could be significantly greater than that due to molar volume expansion.

Taber demonstrated that liquid water migrates towards the freeze line within soil. He showed that other liquids, such as benzene, which contracts when it freezes, also produce frost heave. This excluded molar volume changes as the dominant mechanism for vertical displacement of freezing soil. His experiments further demonstrated the development of ice lenses inside columns of soil that were frozen by cooling the upper surface only, thereby establishing a temperature gradient.

=== Development of ice lenses ===
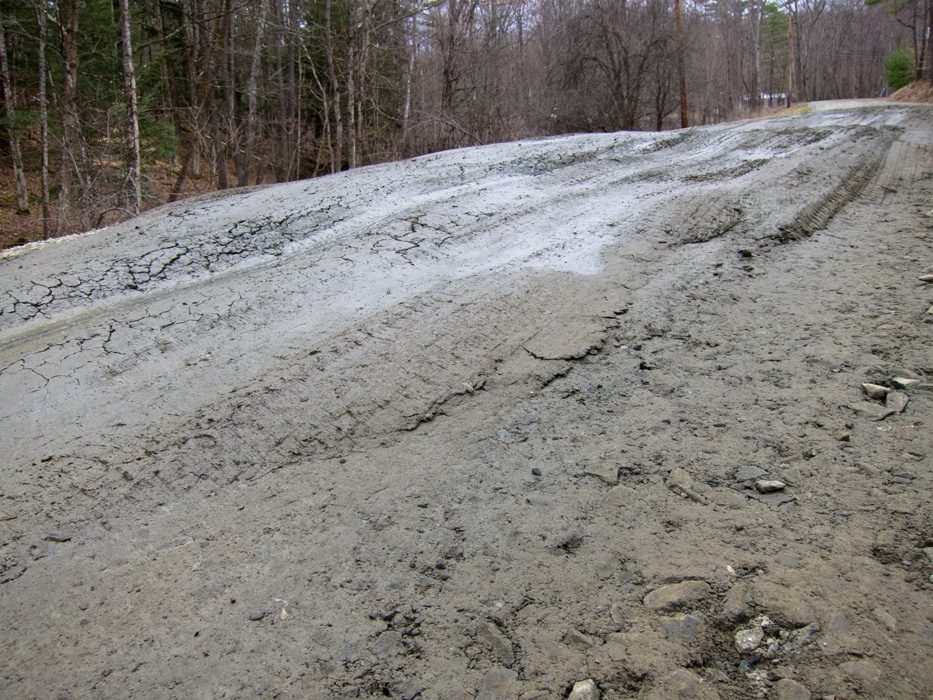
Frost heaves on a rural Vermont road during spring thaw

The dominant cause of soil displacement in frost heaving is the development of ice lenses. During frost heave, one or more soil-free ice lenses grow, and their growth displaces the soil above them. These lenses grow by the continual addition of water from a groundwater source that is lower in the soil and below the freezing line in the soil. The presence of frost-susceptible soil with a pore structure that allows capillary flow is essential to supplying water to the ice lenses as they form.

Owing to the Gibbs–Thomson effect of the confinement of liquids in pores, water in soil can remain liquid at a temperature that is below the bulk freezing point of water. Very fine pores have a very high curvature, and this results in the liquid phase being thermodynamically stable in such media at temperatures sometimes several tens of degrees below the bulk freezing point of the liquid. This effect allows water to percolate through the soil towards the ice lens, allowing the lens to grow.

Another water-transport effect is the preservation of a few molecular layers of liquid water on the surface of the ice lens, and between ice and soil particles. Faraday reported in 1860 on the unfrozen layer of premelted water. Ice premelts against its own vapor, and in contact with silica.

=== Micro-scale processes ===
The same intermolecular forces that cause premelting at surfaces contribute to frost heaving at the particle scale on the bottom side of the forming ice lens. When ice surrounds a fine soil particle as it premelts, the soil particle will be displaced downward towards the warm direction within the thermal gradient due to melting and refreezing of the thin film of water that surrounds the particle. The thickness of such a film is temperature dependent and is thinner on the colder side of the particle.

Water has a lower thermodynamic free energy when in bulk ice than when in the supercooled liquid state. Therefore, there is a continuous replenishment of water flowing from the warm side to the cold side of the particle, and continuous melting to re-establish the thicker film on the warm side. The particle migrates downwards toward the warmer soil in a process that Faraday called "thermal regelation." This effect purifies the ice lenses as they form by repelling fine soil particles. Thus a 10-nanometer film of unfrozen water around each micrometer-sized soil particle can move it 10 micrometers/day in a thermal gradient of as low as 1 °C m^{−1}. As ice lenses grow, they lift the soil above, and segregate soil particles below, while drawing water to the freezing face of the ice lens via capillary action.

== Frost-susceptible soils ==
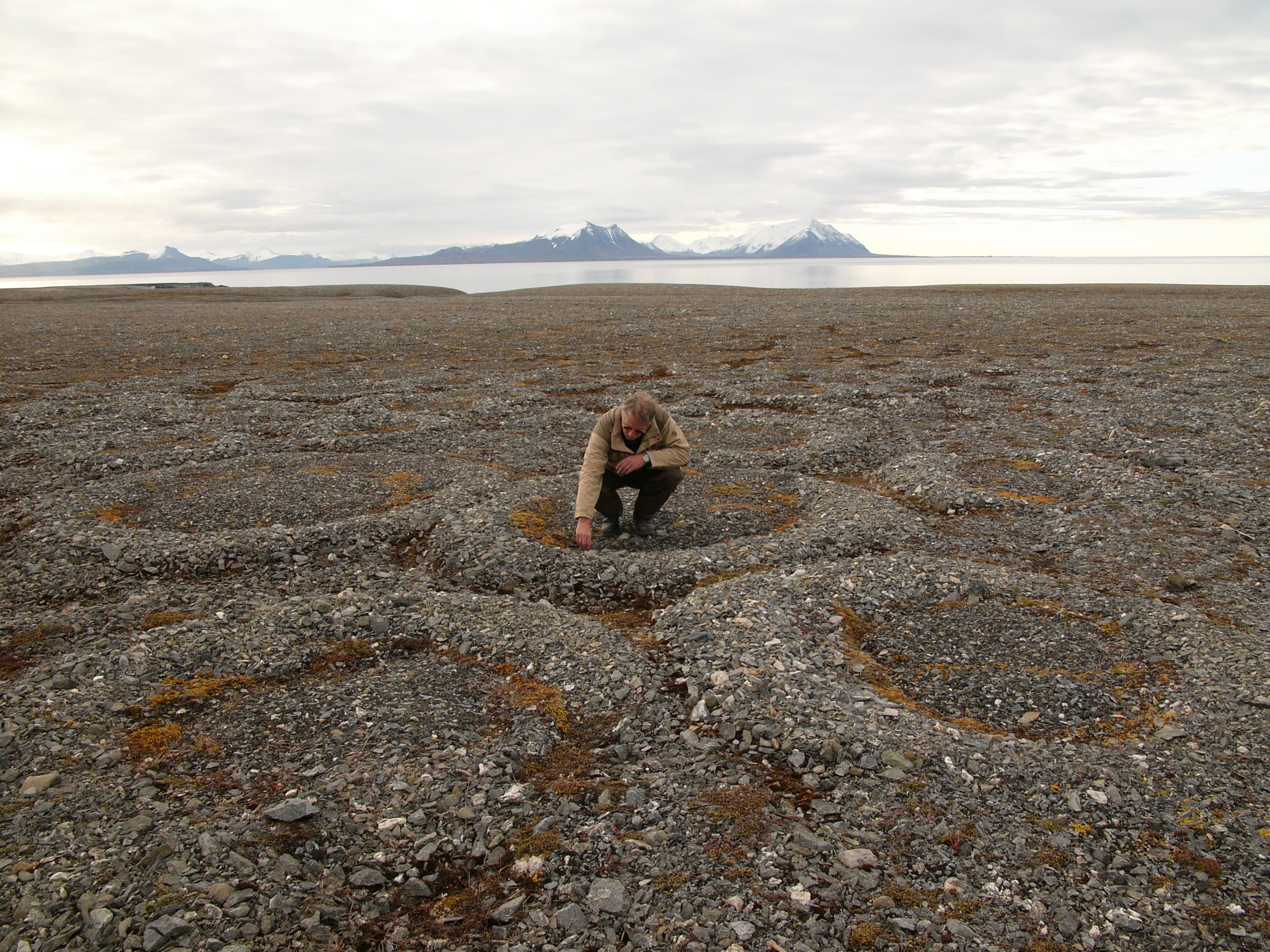
Partially melted and collapsed lithalsas (heaved mounds found in permafrost) have left ring-like structures on the Svalbard Archipelago

Frost heaving requires a frost-susceptible soil, a continual supply of water below (a water table) and freezing temperatures, penetrating into the soil. Frost-susceptible soils are those with pore sizes between particles and particle surface area that promote capillary flow. Silty and loamy soil types, which contain fine particles, are examples of frost-susceptible soils. Many agencies classify materials as being frost susceptible if 10 percent or more constituent particles pass through a 0.075 mm (No. 200) sieve or 3 percent or more pass through a 0.02 mm (No. 635) sieve. Chamberlain reported other, more direct methods for measuring frost susceptibility. Based on such research, standard tests exist to determine the relative frost and thaw weakening susceptibility of soils used in pavement systems by comparing the heave rate and thawed bearing ratio with values in an established classification system for soils where frost-susceptibility is uncertain.

Non-frost-susceptible soils may be too dense to promote water flow (low hydraulic conductivity) or too open in porosity to promote capillary flow. Examples include dense clays with a small pore size and therefore a low hydraulic conductivity and clean sands and gravels, which contain small amounts of fine particles and whose pore sizes are too open to promote capillary flow.

== Landforms created by frost heaving ==
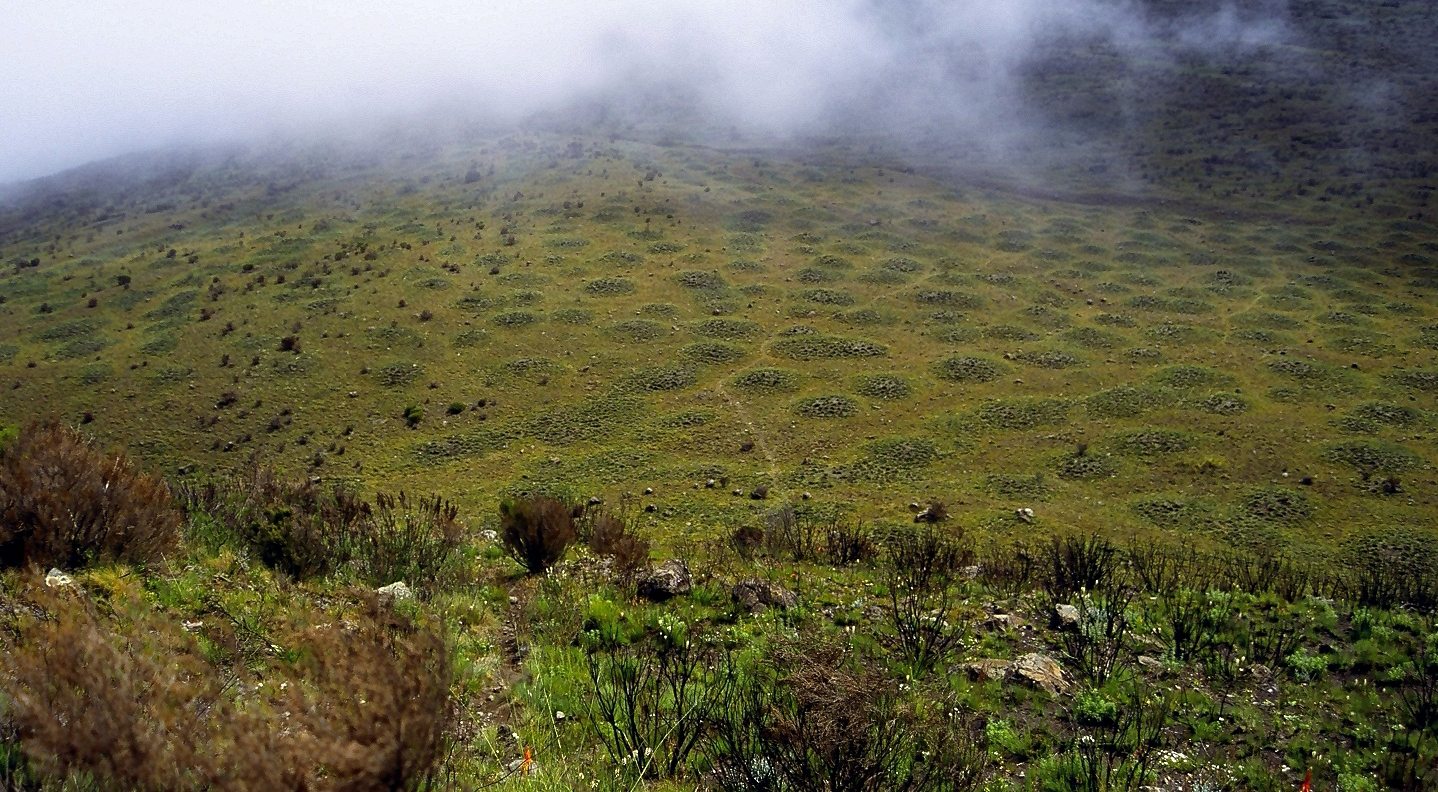
Palsas (heaving of organics-rich soils in discontinuous permafrost) may be found in alpine areas below Mugi Hill on Mount Kenya.

Frost heaving creates raised-soil landforms in various geometries, including circles, polygons and stripes, which may be described as palsas in soils that are rich in organic matter, such as peat, or lithalsa in more mineral-rich soils. The stony lithalsa (heaved mounds) found on the archipelago of Svalbard are an example. Frost heaves occur in alpine regions, even near the equator, as illustrated by palsas on Mount Kenya.

In Arctic permafrost regions, a related type of ground heaving over hundreds of years can create structures, as high as 60 metres, known as pingos, which are fed by an upwelling of ground water, instead of the capillary action that feeds the growth of frost heaves. Cryogenic earth hummocks are a small formation resulting from granular convection that appear in seasonally frozen ground and have many different names; in North America they are earth hummocks; thúfur in Greenland and Iceland; and pounus in Fennoscandia.

Polygonal forms apparently caused by frost heave have been observed in near-polar regions of Mars by the Mars Orbiter Camera (MOC) aboard the Mars Global Surveyor and the HiRISE camera on the Mars Reconnaissance Orbiter. In May 2008 the Mars Phoenix lander touched down on such a polygonal frost-heave landscape and quickly discovered ice a few centimetres below the surface.

== In refrigerated buildings ==
Cold-storage buildings and ice rinks that are maintained at sub-freezing temperatures may freeze the soil below their foundations to a depth of tens of meters. Seasonally frozen buildings, e.g. some ice rinks, may allow the soil to thaw and recover when the building interior is warmed. If a refrigerated building's foundation is placed on frost-susceptible soils with a water table within reach of the freezing front, then the floors of such structures may heave, due to the same mechanisms found in nature. Such structures may be designed to avoid such problems by employing several strategies, separately or in tandem. The strategies include placement of non-frost-susceptible soil beneath the foundation, adding insulation to diminish the penetration of the freezing front, and heating the soil beneath the building sufficiently to keep it from freezing. Seasonally operated ice rinks can mitigate the rate of subsurface freezing by raising the temperature of the ice.

== See also ==
- Cryoturbation – Mixing of soil horizons due to freezing and thawing
- Frost law – Weather-related road-traffic restrictions
- Frost weathering – Mechanical weathering induced by freezing water
- Ice jacking – Structural damage caused by freezing water
- Palsa – Low frost heave in polar and subpolar climates
