= Beijerinckiaceae =

Scientific classification
- Domain: Bacteria
- Kingdom: Pseudomonadati
- Phylum: Pseudomonadota
- Class: Alphaproteobacteria
- Order: Hyphomicrobiales
- Family: Beijerinckiaceae; Garrity et al. 2006

Genera
- Beijerinckia Derx 1950 (Approved Lists 1980); Methylocapsa Dedysh et al. 2002; Methylocella Dedysh et al. 2000; Methyloferula Vorobev et al. 2011; Methylorosula Berestovskaya et al. 2012; Methylovirgula Vorob'ev et al. 2009; Pseudochelatococcus Kämpfer et al. 2015

Family of bacteria

The Beijerinckiaceae are a family of Hyphomicrobiales named after the Dutch microbiologist Martinus Willem Beijerinck. Beijerinckia is a genus of free-living aerobic nitrogen-fixing bacteria. Acidotolerant Beijerinckiaceae has been shown to be the main bacterial methanol sink in a deciduous forest soil and highlights their importance for the conversion of methanol in forest soils.

Together with Methylocystaceae they are alphaproteobacterial methanotrophs.
