= Permafrost =

Type of soil in frozen state

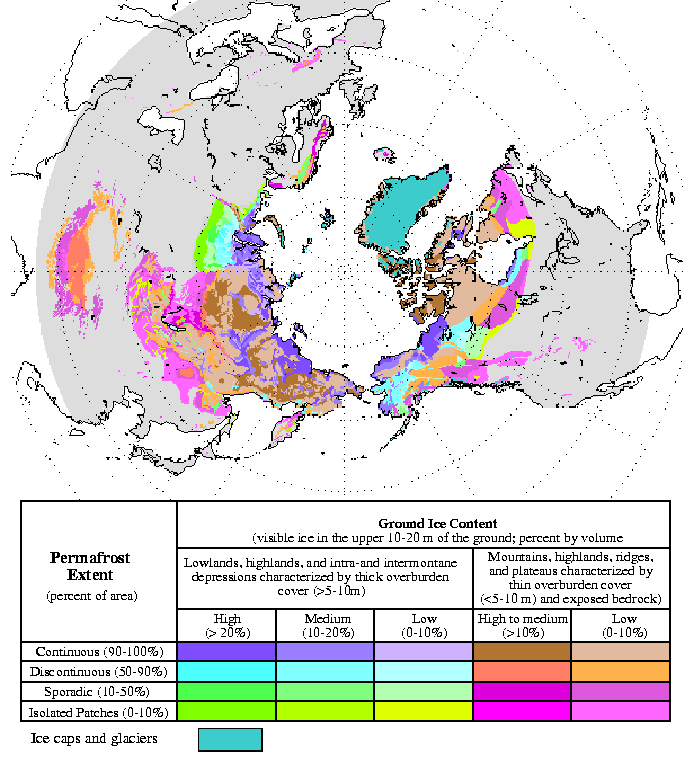
- Extent and types of permafrost in the Northern Hemisphere as per International Permafrost Association

Permafrost (from perma- 'permanent' and frost) is soil or underwater sediment which continuously remains below 0 °C (32 °F) for two years or more; the oldest permafrost has been continuously frozen for around 700,000 years. Whilst the shallowest permafrost has a vertical extent of below a meter (3 ft), the deepest is greater than 1,500 m (4,900 ft). Similarly, the area of individual permafrost zones may be limited to narrow mountain summits or extend across vast Arctic regions. The ground beneath glaciers and ice sheets is not usually defined as permafrost, so on land, permafrost is generally located beneath a so-called active layer of soil which freezes and thaws depending on the season.

Around 15% of the exposed land surface of the Northern Hemisphere, and 11% of the global land surface, is underlain by permafrost, covering a total area of around 18 million km^{2} (6.9 million sq mi). This includes large areas of Alaska, Canada, Greenland, and Siberia. It is also located in high mountain regions, with the Tibetan Plateau being a prominent example. Only a minority of permafrost exists in the Southern Hemisphere, where it is consigned to mountain slopes like in the Andes of Patagonia, the Southern Alps of New Zealand, or the highest mountains of Antarctica.

Permafrost contains large amounts of dead biomass that has accumulated throughout millennia without having had the chance to fully decompose and release its carbon, making tundra soil a carbon sink. As global warming heats the ecosystem, frozen soil thaws and becomes warm enough for decomposition to start anew, accelerating the permafrost carbon cycle. Depending on conditions at the time of thaw, decomposition can release either carbon dioxide or methane, and these greenhouse gas emissions act as a climate change feedback. The emissions from thawing permafrost will have a sufficient impact on the climate to impact global carbon budgets. It is difficult to accurately predict how much greenhouse gases the permafrost releases because the different thaw processes are still uncertain. There is widespread agreement that the emissions will be smaller than human-caused emissions and are not large enough to result in runaway warming. Instead, the annual permafrost emissions are likely comparable with global emissions from deforestation, or to annual emissions of large countries such as Russia, the United States or China.

Apart from its climate impact, permafrost thaw brings more risks. Formerly frozen ground often contains enough ice that when it thaws, hydraulic saturation is suddenly exceeded, so the ground shifts substantially and may even collapse outright. Many buildings and other infrastructure were built on permafrost when it was frozen and stable, and so are vulnerable to collapse if it thaws. Estimates suggest nearly 70% of such infrastructure is at risk by 2050, and that the associated costs could rise to tens of billions of dollars in the second half of the century. Furthermore, between 13,000 and 20,000 sites contaminated with toxic waste are present in the permafrost, as well as natural mercury deposits, which are all liable to leak and pollute the environment as the warming progresses. Lastly, concerns have been raised about the potential for pathogenic microorganisms surviving the thaw and contributing to future pandemics. However, this is considered unlikely, and a scientific review on the subject describes the risks as "generally low".

== Classification and extent ==
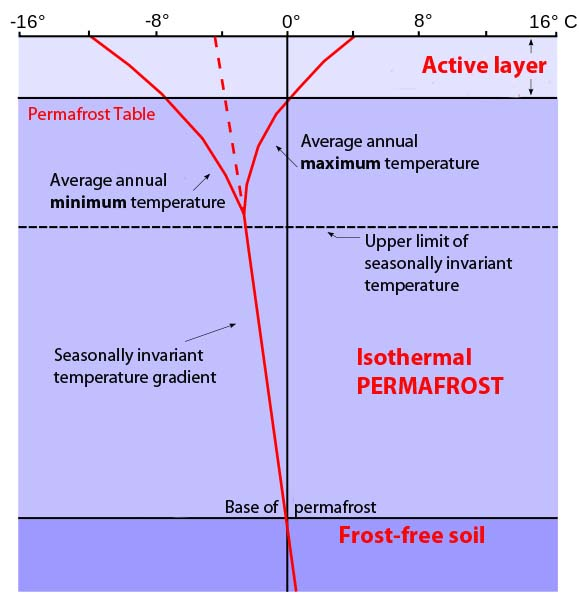
Permafrost temperature profile. Permafrost occupies the middle zone, with the active layer above it, while geothermal activity keeps the lowest layer above freezing. The vertical 0 °C or 32 °F line denotes the average annual temperature that is crucial for the upper and lower limit of the permafrost zone, while the red lines represent seasonal temperature changes and seasonal temperature extremes. Solid curved lines at the top show seasonal maximum and minimum temperatures in the active layer, while the red dotted-to-solid line depicts the average temperature profile with depth of soil in a permafrost region.

Permafrost is soil, rock or sediment that is frozen for more than two consecutive years. In practice, this means that permafrost occurs at a mean annual temperature of 0 °C (32.0 °F) or below. In the coldest regions, the depth of continuous permafrost can exceed 1,400 m (4,600 ft). It typically exists beneath the so-called active layer, which freezes and thaws annually, and so can support plant growth, as the roots can only take hold in the soil that's thawed. Active layer thickness is measured during its maximum extent at the end of summer: as of 2018, the average thickness in the Northern Hemisphere is ~145 centimetres (4.76 ft), but there are significant regional differences. Northeastern Siberia, Alaska and Greenland have the most solid permafrost with the lowest extent of active layer (less than 50 centimetres (1.6 ft) on average, and sometimes only 30 centimetres (0.98 ft)), while southern Norway and the Mongolian Plateau are the only areas where the average active layer is deeper than 600 centimetres (20 ft), with the record of 10 metres (33 ft). The border between active layer and permafrost itself is sometimes called permafrost table.

Around 15% of Northern Hemisphere land that is not completely covered by ice is directly underlain by permafrost; 22% is defined as part of a permafrost zone or region. This is because only slightly more than half of this area is defined as a continuous permafrost zone, where 90%–100% of the land is underlain by permafrost. Around 20% is instead defined as discontinuous permafrost, where the coverage is between 50% and 90%. Finally, the remaining <30% of permafrost regions consists of areas with 10%–50% coverage, which are defined as sporadic permafrost zones, and some areas that have isolated patches of permafrost covering 10% or less of their area. Most of this area is found in Siberia, northern Canada, Alaska and Greenland. Beneath the active layer annual temperature swings of permafrost become smaller with depth. The greatest depth of permafrost occurs right before the point where geothermal heat maintains a temperature above freezing. Above that bottom limit there may be permafrost with a consistent annual temperature—"isothermal permafrost".

=== Continuity of coverage ===
Permafrost typically forms in any climate where the mean annual air temperature is lower than the freezing point of water. Exceptions are found in humid boreal forests, such as in Northern Scandinavia and the North-Eastern part of European Russia west of the Urals, where snow acts as an insulating blanket. Glaciated areas may also be exceptions. Since all glaciers are warmed at their base by geothermal heat, temperate glaciers, which are near the pressure melting point throughout, may have liquid water at the interface with the ground and are therefore free of underlying permafrost. "Fossil" cold anomalies in the geothermal gradient in areas where deep permafrost developed during the Pleistocene persist down to several hundred metres. This is evident from temperature measurements in boreholes in North America and Europe.

==== Discontinuous permafrost ====
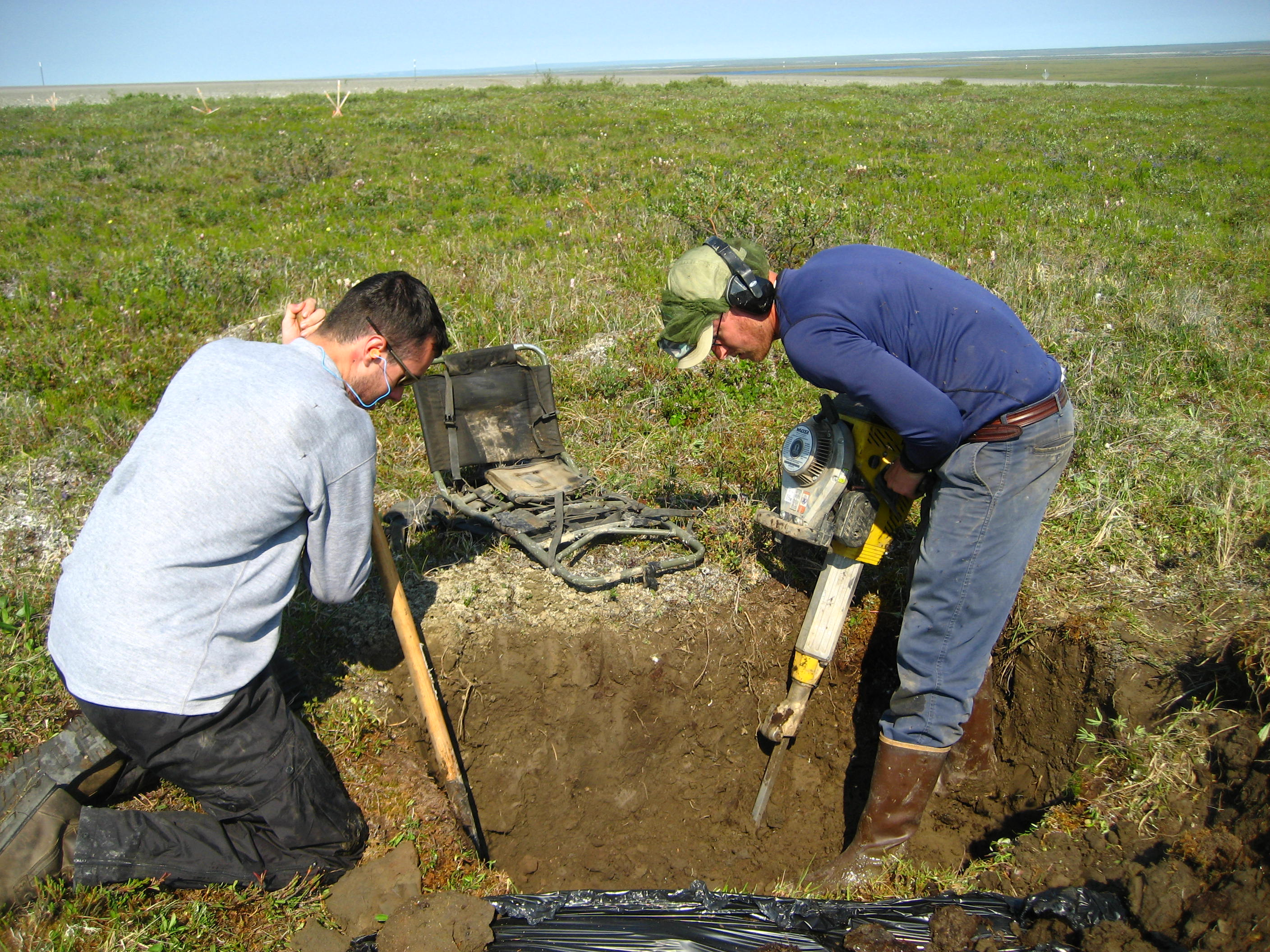
Excavating ice-rich permafrost with a jackhammer in Alaska.

The below-ground temperature varies less from season to season than the air temperature, with mean annual temperatures tending to increase with depth due to the geothermal crustal gradient. Thus, if the mean annual air temperature is only slightly below 0 °C (32 °F), permafrost will form only in spots that are sheltered (usually with a northern or southern aspect, in the north and south hemispheres respectively) creating discontinuous permafrost. Usually, permafrost will remain discontinuous in a climate where the mean annual soil surface temperature is between −5 and 0 °C (23 and 32 °F). In the moist-wintered areas mentioned before, there may not even be discontinuous permafrost down to −2 °C (28 °F). Discontinuous permafrost is often further divided into extensive discontinuous permafrost, where permafrost covers between 50 and 90 percent of the landscape and is usually found in areas with mean annual temperatures between −2 and −4 °C (28 and 25 °F), and sporadic permafrost, where permafrost cover is less than 50 percent of the landscape and typically occurs at mean annual temperatures between 0 and −2 °C (32 and 28 °F).

In soil science, the sporadic permafrost zone is abbreviated SPZ and the extensive discontinuous permafrost zone DPZ. Exceptions occur in un-glaciated Siberia and Alaska where the present depth of permafrost is a relic of climatic conditions during glacial ages where winters were up to 11 °C (20 °F) colder than those of today.

==== Continuous permafrost ====
Estimated extent of alpine permafrost by region
Locality	Area
Qinghai-Tibet Plateau	1,300,000 km^{2} (500,000 mi^{2})
Khangai-Altai Mountains	1,000,000 km^{2} (390,000 mi^{2})
Brooks Range	263,000 km^{2} (102,000 mi^{2})
Siberian Mountains	255,000 km^{2} (98,000 mi^{2})
Greenland	251,000 km^{2} (97,000 mi^{2})
Ural Mountains	125,000 km^{2} (48,000 mi^{2})
Andes	100,000 km^{2} (39,000 mi^{2})
Rocky Mountains (US and Canada)	100,000 km^{2} (39,000 mi^{2})
Alps	80,000 km^{2} (31,000 mi^{2})
Fennoscandian mountains	75,000 km^{2} (29,000 mi^{2})
Remaining	<50,000 km^{2} (19,000 mi^{2})

At mean annual soil surface temperatures below −5 °C (23 °F) the influence of aspect can never be sufficient to thaw permafrost and a zone of continuous permafrost (abbreviated to CPZ) forms. A line of continuous permafrost in the Northern Hemisphere represents the most southern border where land is covered by continuous permafrost or glacial ice. The line of continuous permafrost varies around the world northward or southward due to regional climatic changes. In the Southern Hemisphere, most of the equivalent line would fall within the Southern Ocean if there were land there. Most of the Antarctic continent is overlain by glaciers, under which much of the terrain is subject to basal melting. The exposed land of Antarctica is substantially underlain with permafrost, some of which is subject to warming and thawing along the coastline.

=== Alpine permafrost ===
A range of elevations in both the Northern and Southern Hemisphere are cold enough to support perennially frozen ground: some of the best-known examples include the Canadian Rockies, the European Alps, Himalaya and the Tien Shan. In general, it has been found that extensive alpine permafrost requires mean annual air temperature of −3 °C (27 °F), though this can vary depending on local topography, and some mountain areas are known to support permafrost at −1 °C (30 °F). It is also possible for subsurface alpine permafrost to be covered by warmer, vegetation-supporting soil.

Alpine permafrost is particularly difficult to study, and systematic research efforts did not begin until the 1970s. Consequently, there remain uncertainties about its geography. As recently as 2009, permafrost had been discovered in a new area – Africa's highest peak, Mount Kilimanjaro (4,700 m (15,400 ft) above sea level and approximately 3° south of the equator). In 2014, a collection of regional estimates of alpine permafrost extent had established a global extent of 3,560,000 km^{2} (1,370,000 mi^{2}). However, by 2014, alpine permafrost in the Andes had not been fully mapped, although its extent has been modeled to assess the amount of water bound up in these areas.

=== Subsea permafrost ===
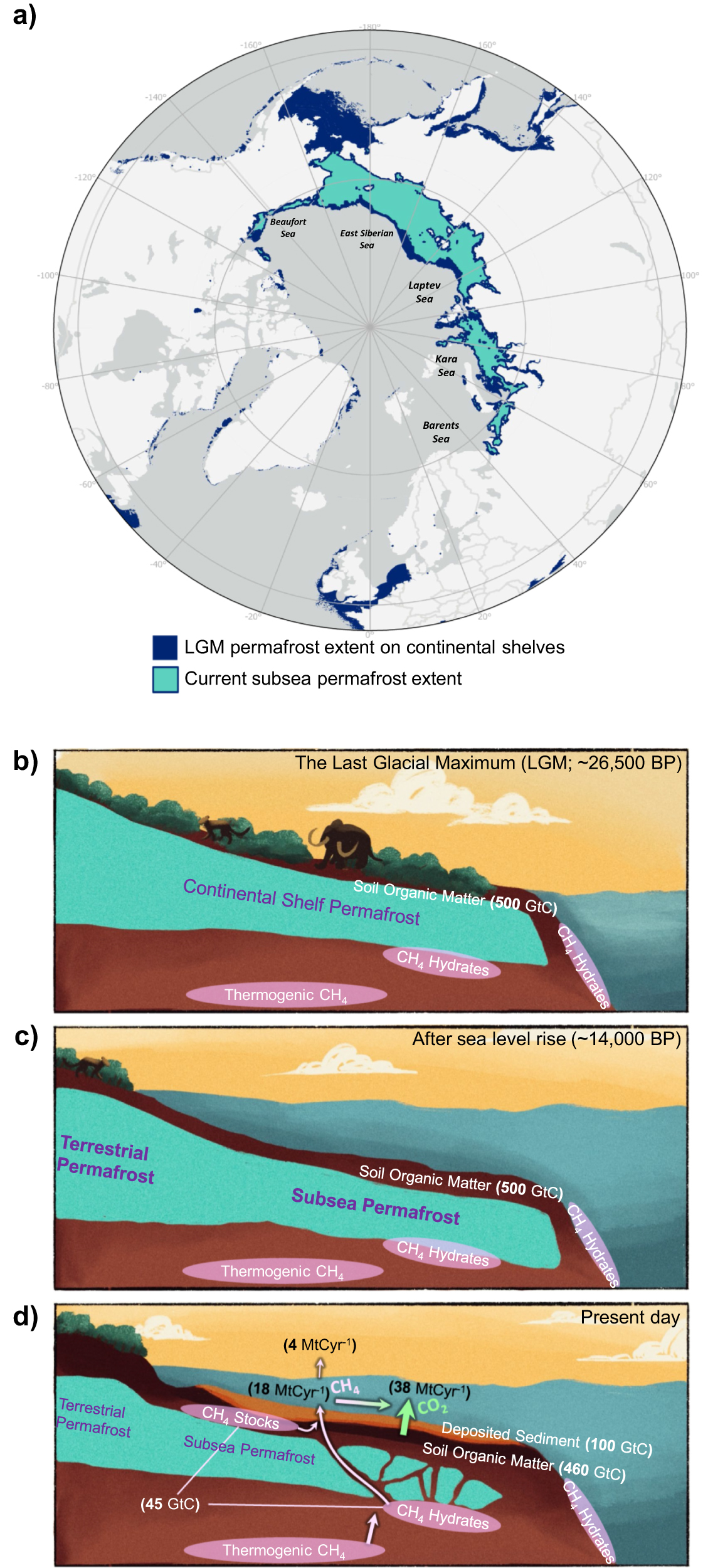
Changes in subsea permafrost extent and structure between the Last Glacial Maximum and 2020.

Subsea permafrost occurs beneath the seabed and exists in the continental shelves of the polar regions. These areas formed during the last Ice Age, when a larger portion of Earth's water was bound up in ice sheets on land and when sea levels were low. As the ice sheets melted to again become seawater during the Holocene glacial retreat, coastal permafrost became submerged shelves under relatively warm and salty boundary conditions, compared to surface permafrost. Since then, these conditions led to the gradual and ongoing decline of subsea permafrost extent. Nevertheless, its presence remains an important consideration for the "design, construction, and operation of coastal facilities, structures founded on the seabed, artificial islands, sub-sea pipelines, and wells drilled for exploration and production". Subsea permafrost can also overlay deposits of methane clathrate, which were once speculated to be a major climate tipping point in what was known as a clathrate gun hypothesis, but are now no longer believed to play any role in projected climate change.

=== Past extent of permafrost ===
At the Last Glacial Maximum, continuous permafrost covered a much greater area than it does today, covering all of ice-free Europe south to about Szeged (southeastern Hungary) and the Sea of Azov (then dry land) and East Asia south to present-day Changchun and Abashiri. In North America, only an extremely narrow belt of permafrost existed south of the ice sheet at about the latitude of New Jersey through southern Iowa and northern Missouri, but permafrost was more extensive in the drier western regions where it extended to the southern border of Idaho and Oregon. In the Southern Hemisphere, there is some evidence for former permafrost from this period in central Otago and Argentine Patagonia, but was probably discontinuous, and is related to the tundra. Alpine permafrost also occurred in the Drakensberg during glacial maxima above about 3,000 metres (9,840 ft).

== Manifestations ==
Time required for permafrost to reach depth at Prudhoe Bay, Alaska
Time (yr)	Permafrost depth
1	4.44 m (14.6 ft)
350	79.9 m (262 ft)
3,500	219.3 m (719 ft)
35,000	461.4 m (1,514 ft)
100,000	567.8 m (1,863 ft)
225,000	626.5 m (2,055 ft)
775,000	687.7 m (2,256 ft)

=== Base depth ===
Permafrost extends to a base depth where geothermal heat from the Earth and the mean annual temperature at the surface achieve an equilibrium temperature of 0 °C (32 °F). This base depth of permafrost can vary wildly – it is less than a meter (3 ft) in the areas where it is shallowest, yet reaches 1,493 m (4,898 ft) in the northern Lena and Yana River basins in Siberia. Calculations indicate that the formation time of permafrost greatly slows past the first several metres. For instance, over half a million years was required to form the deep permafrost underlying Prudhoe Bay, Alaska, a time period extending over several glacial and interglacial cycles of the Pleistocene.

Base depth is affected by the underlying geology, and particularly by thermal conductivity, which is lower for permafrost in soil than in bedrock. Lower conductivity leaves permafrost less affected by the geothermal gradient, which is the rate of increasing temperature with respect to increasing depth in the Earth's interior. It occurs as the Earth's internal thermal energy is generated by radioactive decay of unstable isotopes and flows to the surface by conduction at a rate of ~47 terawatts (TW). Away from tectonic plate boundaries, this is equivalent to an average heat flow of 25–30 °C/km (124–139 °F/mi) near the surface.

=== Massive ground ice ===
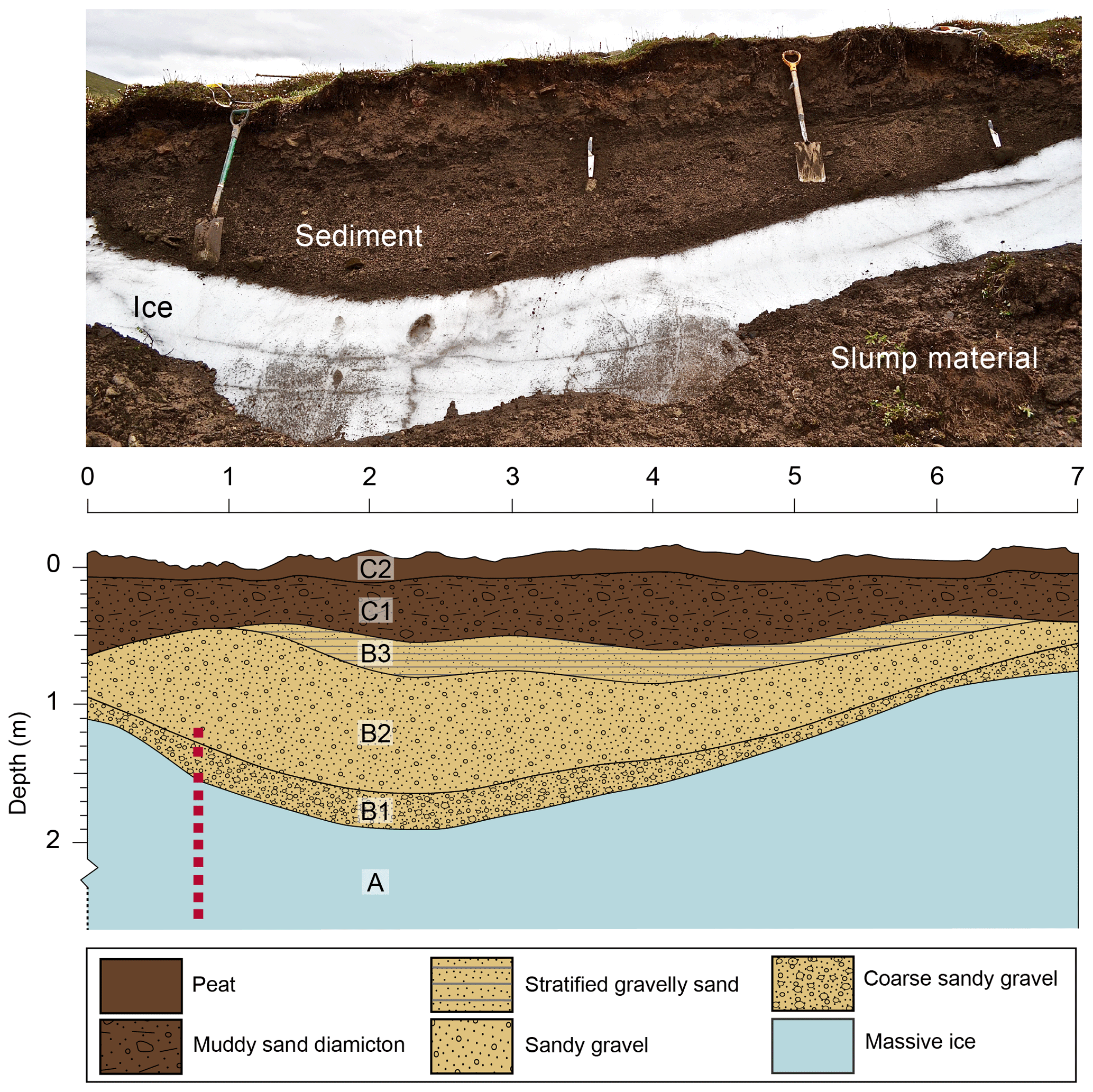
Labelled example of a massive buried ice deposit in Bylot Island, Canada.

When the ice content of a permafrost exceeds 250 percent (ice to dry soil by mass) it is classified as massive ice. Massive ice bodies can range in composition, in every conceivable gradation from icy mud to pure ice. Massive icy beds have a minimum thickness of at least 2 m and a short diameter of at least 10 m. First recorded North American observations of this phenomenon were by European scientists at Canning River (Alaska) in 1919. Russian literature provides an earlier date of 1735 and 1739 during the Great North Expedition by P. Lassinius and Khariton Laptev, respectively. Russian investigators including I. A. Lopatin, B. Khegbomov, S. Taber and G. Beskow had also formulated the original theories for ice inclusion in freezing soils.

While there are four categories of ice in permafrost – pore ice, ice wedges (also known as vein ice), buried surface ice and intrasedimental (sometimes also called constitutional) ice – only the last two tend to be large enough to qualify as massive ground ice. These two types usually occur separately, but may be found together, like on the coast of Tuktoyaktuk in western Arctic Canada, where the remains of Laurentide Ice Sheet are located.

Buried surface ice may derive from snow, frozen lake or sea ice, aufeis (stranded river ice) and even buried glacial ice from the former Pleistocene ice sheets. The latter hold enormous value for paleoglaciological research, yet even as of 2022, the total extent and volume of such buried ancient ice is unknown. Notable sites with known ancient ice deposits include Yenisei River valley in Siberia, Russia as well as Banks and Bylot Island in Canada's Nunavut and Northwest Territories. Some of the buried ice sheet remnants are known to host thermokarst lakes.

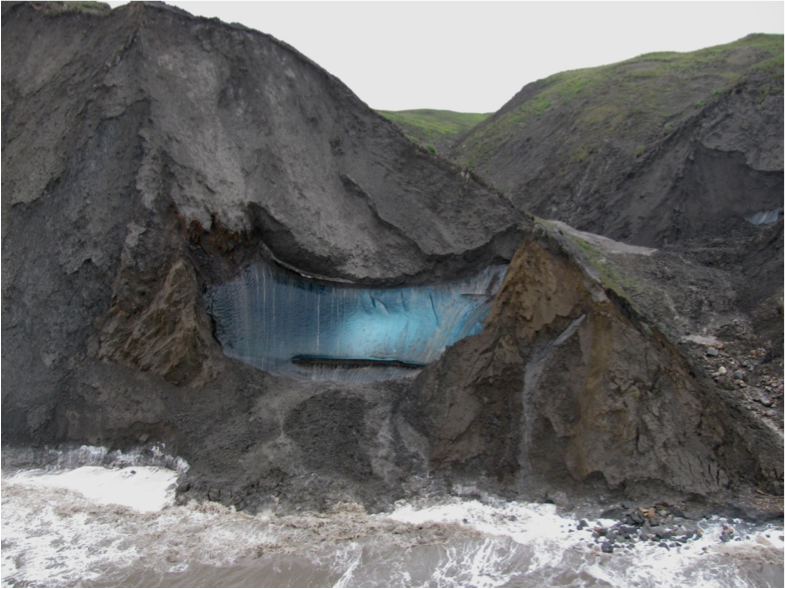
Cross-section showing massive buried ground ice (blue) within permafrost.

Intrasedimental or constitutional ice has been widely observed and studied across Canada. It forms when subterranean waters freeze in place, and is subdivided into intrusive, injection and segregational ice. The latter is the dominant type, formed after crystallizational differentiation in wet sediments, which occurs when water migrates to the freezing front under the influence of van der Waals forces. This is a slow process, which primarily occurs in silts with salinity less than 20% of seawater: silt sediments with higher salinity and clay sediments instead have water movement prior to ice formation dominated by rheological processes. Consequently, it takes between 1 and 1000 years to form intrasedimental ice in the top 2.5 meters of clay sediments, yet it takes between 10 and 10,000 years for peat sediments and between 1,000 and 1,000,000 years for silt sediments.

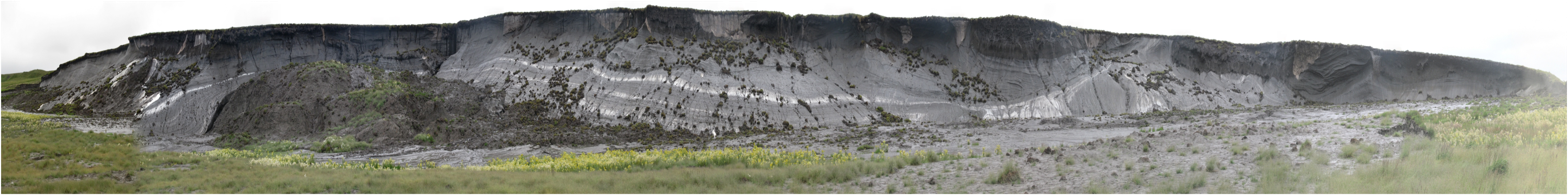
Cliff wall of a retrogressive thaw slump located on the southern coast of Herschel Island within an approximately 22-metre (72 ft) by 1,300-metre (4,300 ft) headwall.

=== Landforms ===
Permafrost processes such as thermal contraction generating cracks which eventually become ice wedges and solifluction – gradual movement of soil down the slope as it repeatedly freezes and thaws – often lead to the formation of ground polygons, rings, steps and other forms of patterned ground found in arctic, periglacial and alpine areas. In ice-rich permafrost areas, melting of ground ice initiates thermokarst landforms such as thermokarst lakes, thaw slumps, thermal-erosion gullies, and active layer detachments. Notably, unusually deep permafrost in Arctic moorlands and bogs often attracts meltwater in warmer seasons, which pools and freezes to form ice lenses, and the surrounding ground begins to jut outward at a slope. This can eventually result in the formation of large-scale land forms around this core of permafrost, such as palsas – long (15–150 m (49–492 ft)), wide (10–30 m (33–98 ft)) yet shallow (<1–6 m (3 ft 3 in – 19 ft 8 in) tall) peat mounds – and the even larger pingos, which can be 3–70 m (10–230 ft) high and 30–1,000 m (98–3,281 ft) in diameter.

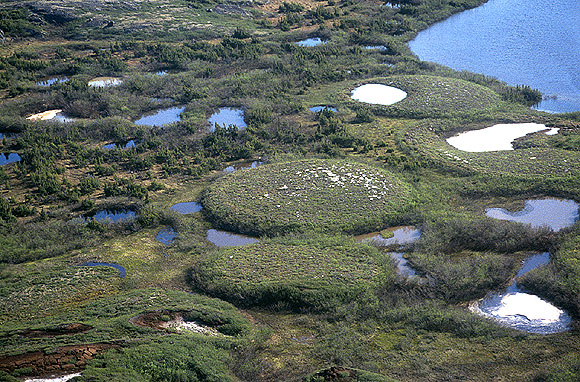
A group of palsas, as seen from above, formed by the growth of ice lenses.

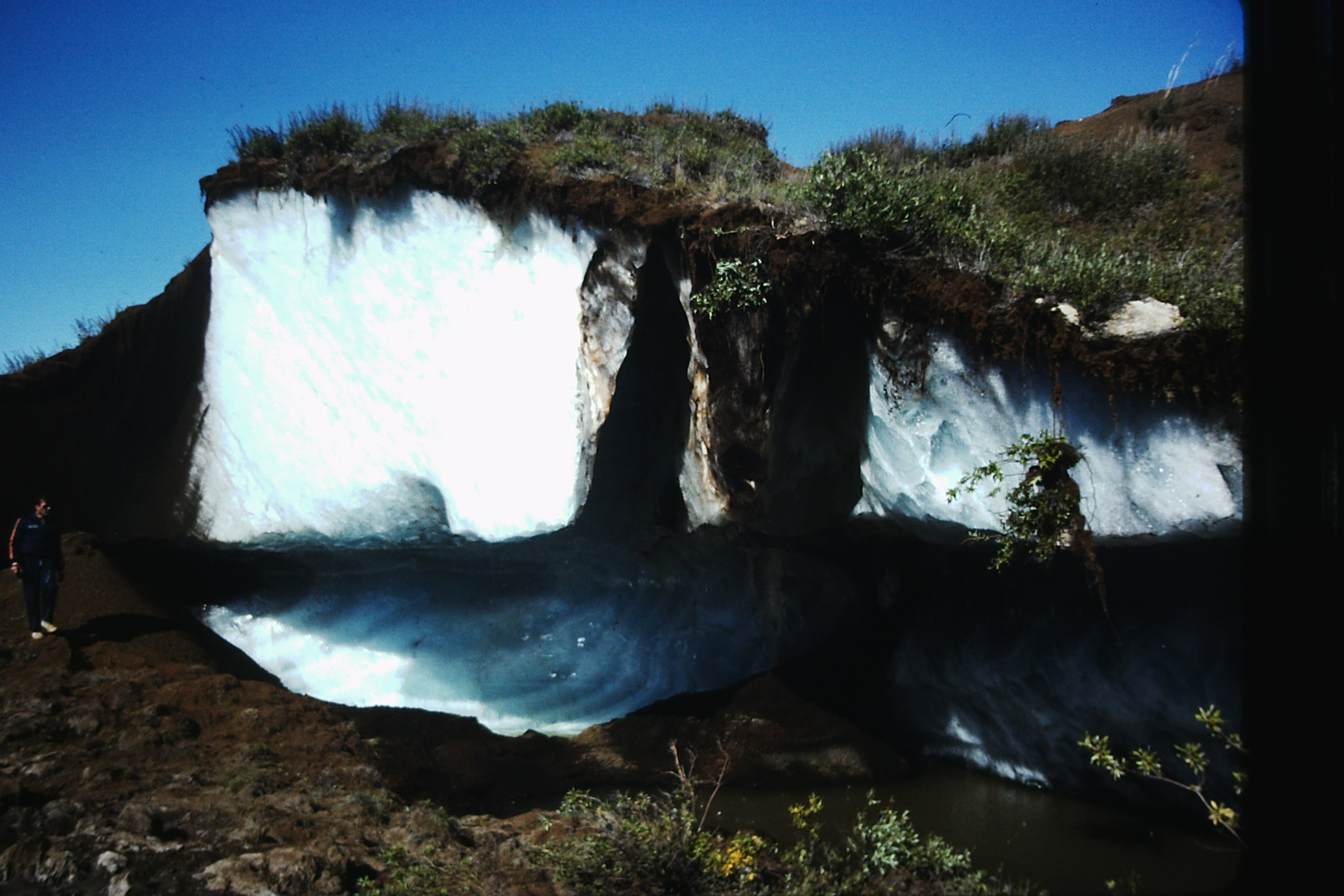
Injection ice in a pingo, Mackenzie delta area.

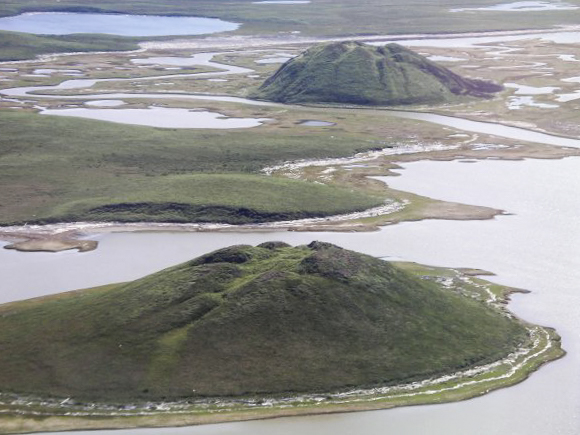
Pingos near Tuktoyaktuk, Northwest Territories, Canada

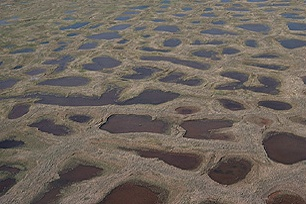
Ground polygons

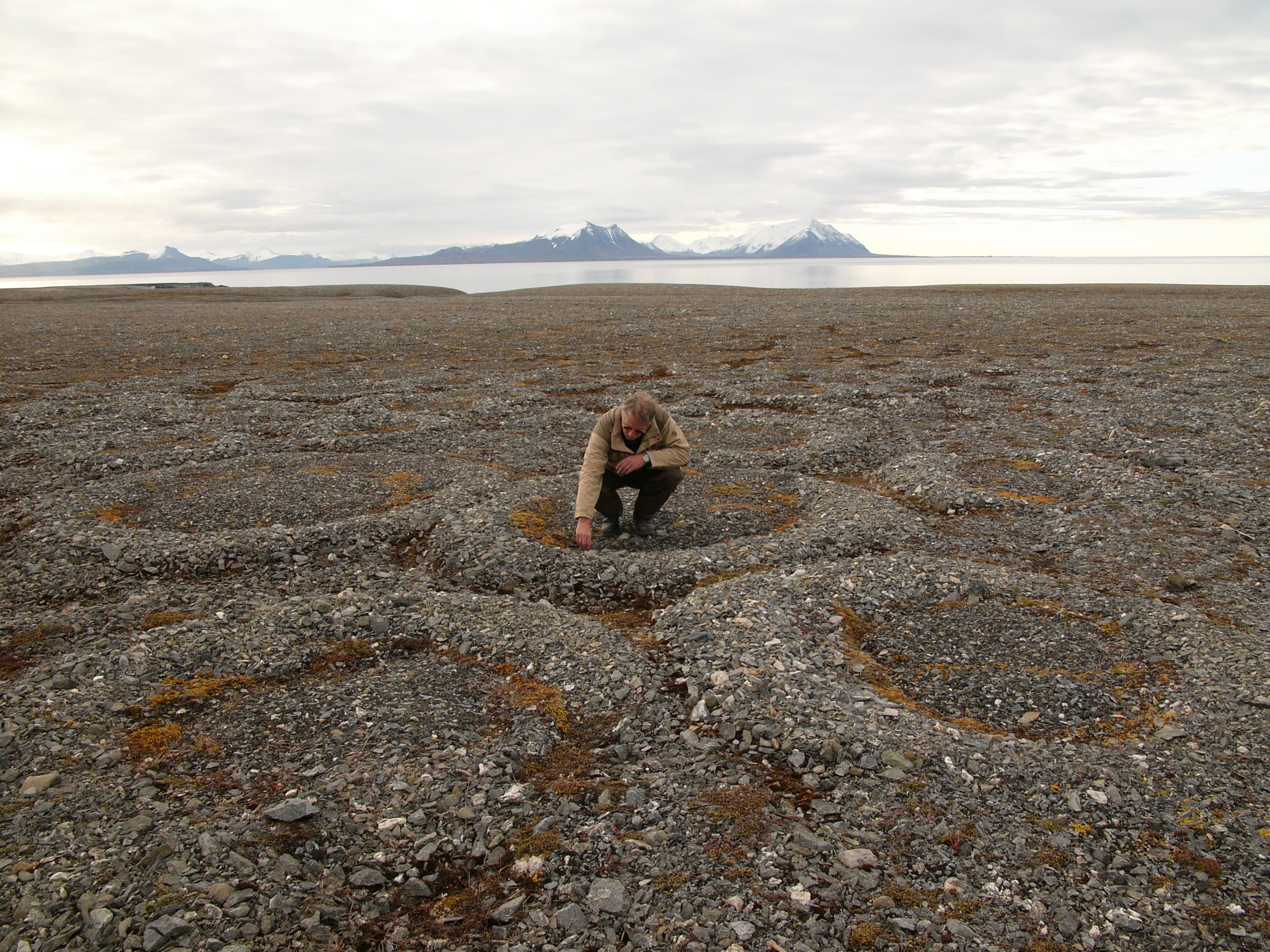
Stone rings on Spitsbergen

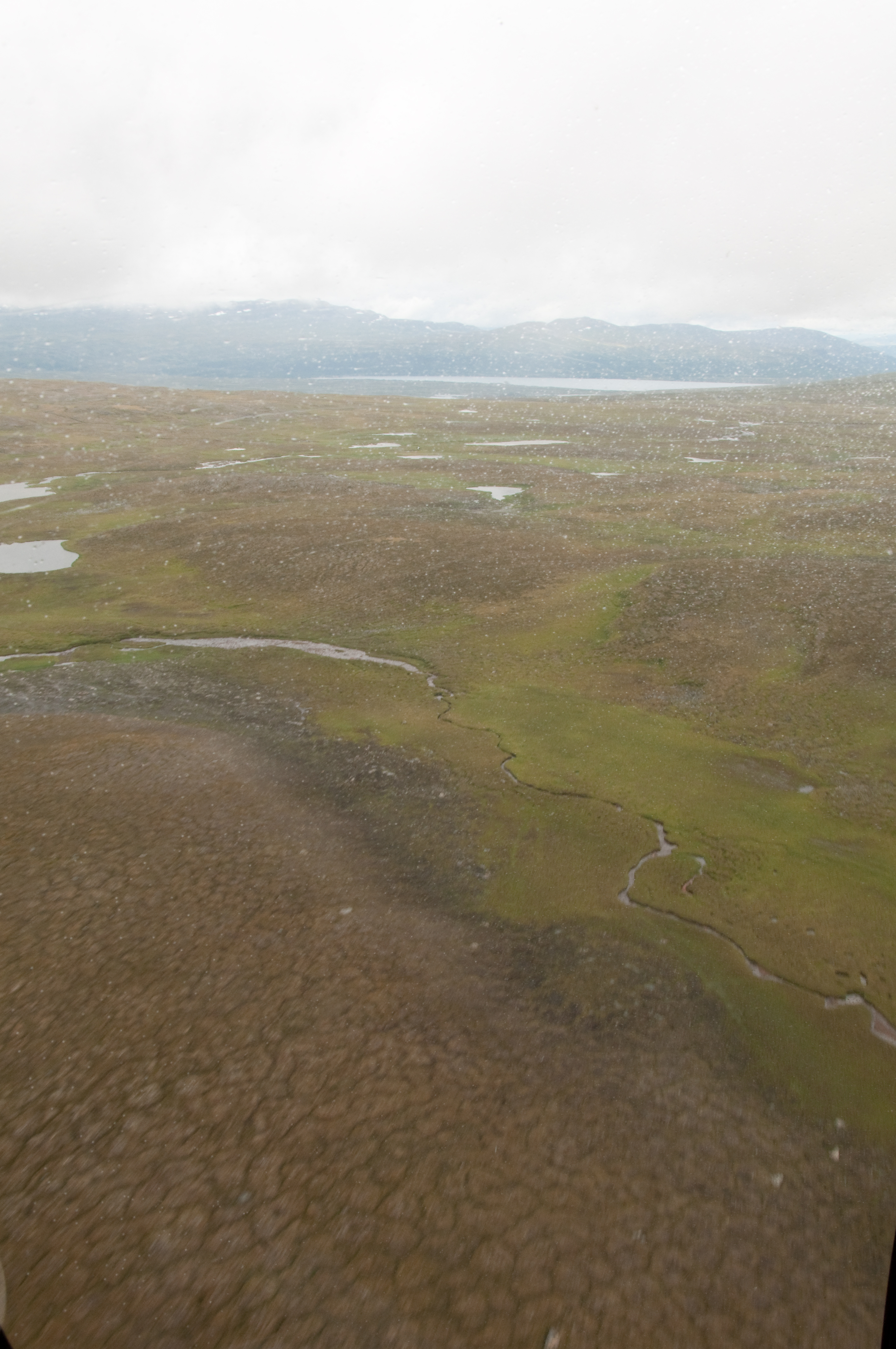
Helicopter view of ground polygons and ice lenses at Padjelanta National Park, Sweden

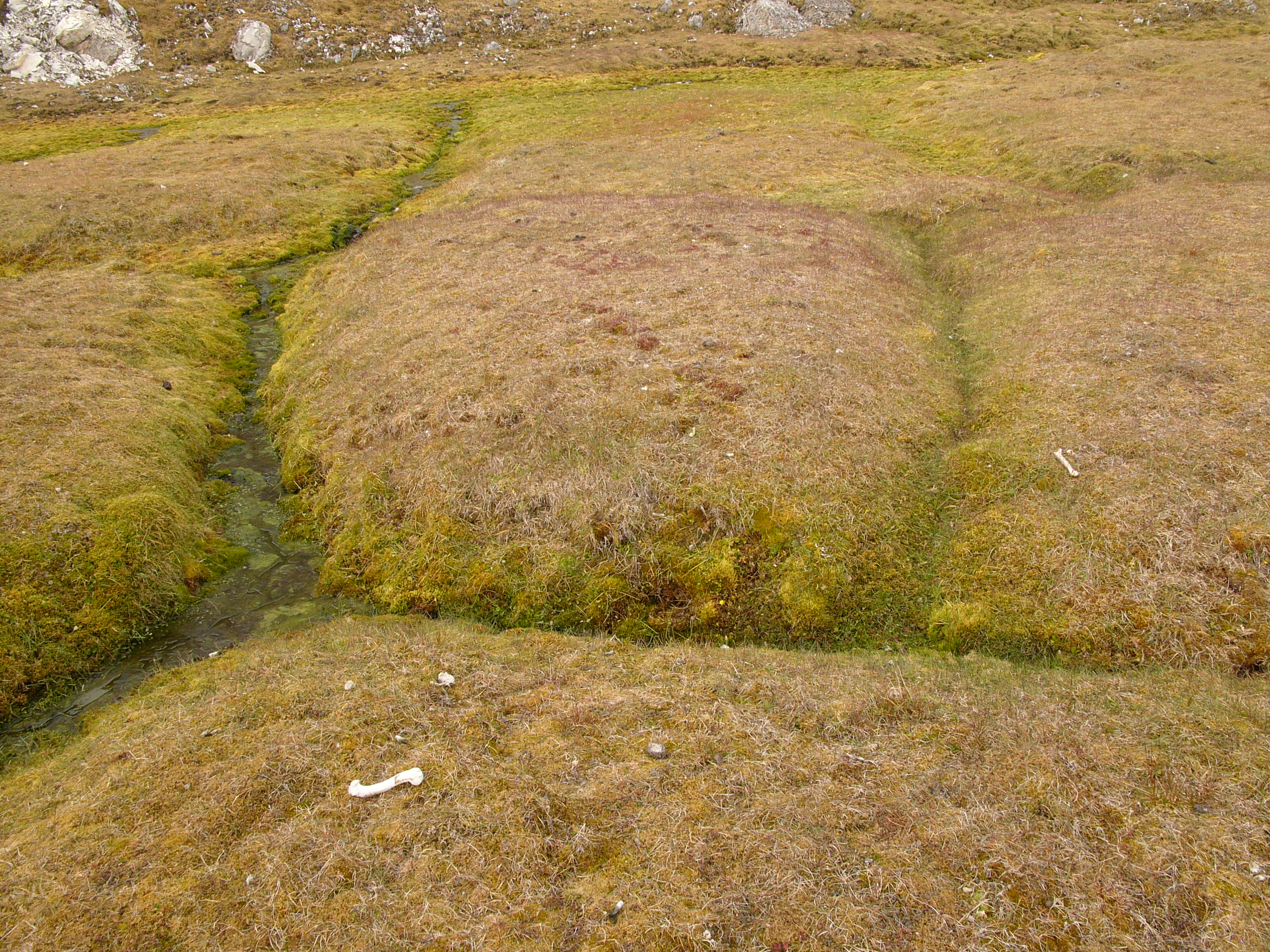
Ice wedges seen from top

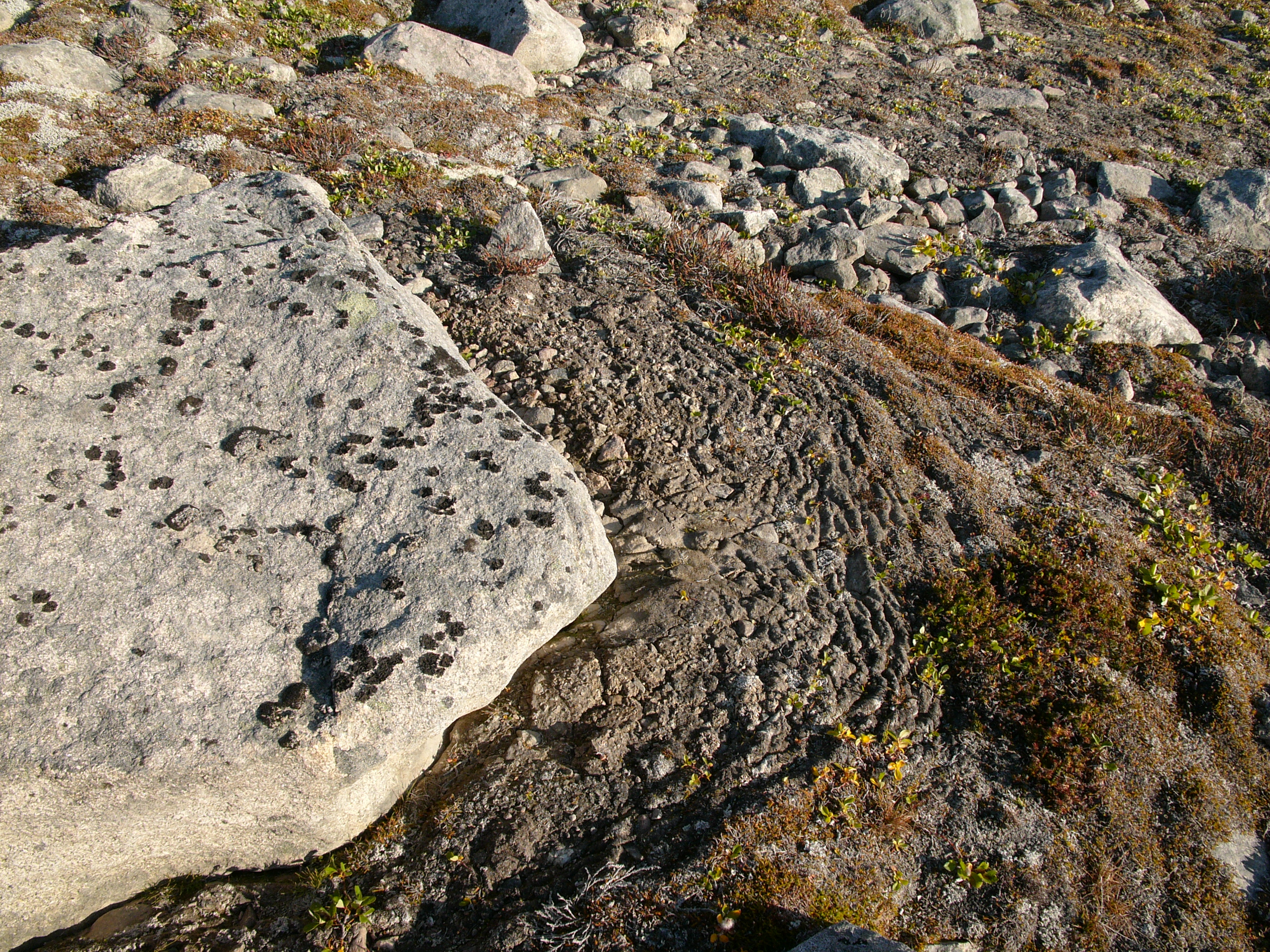
Solifluction on Svalbard

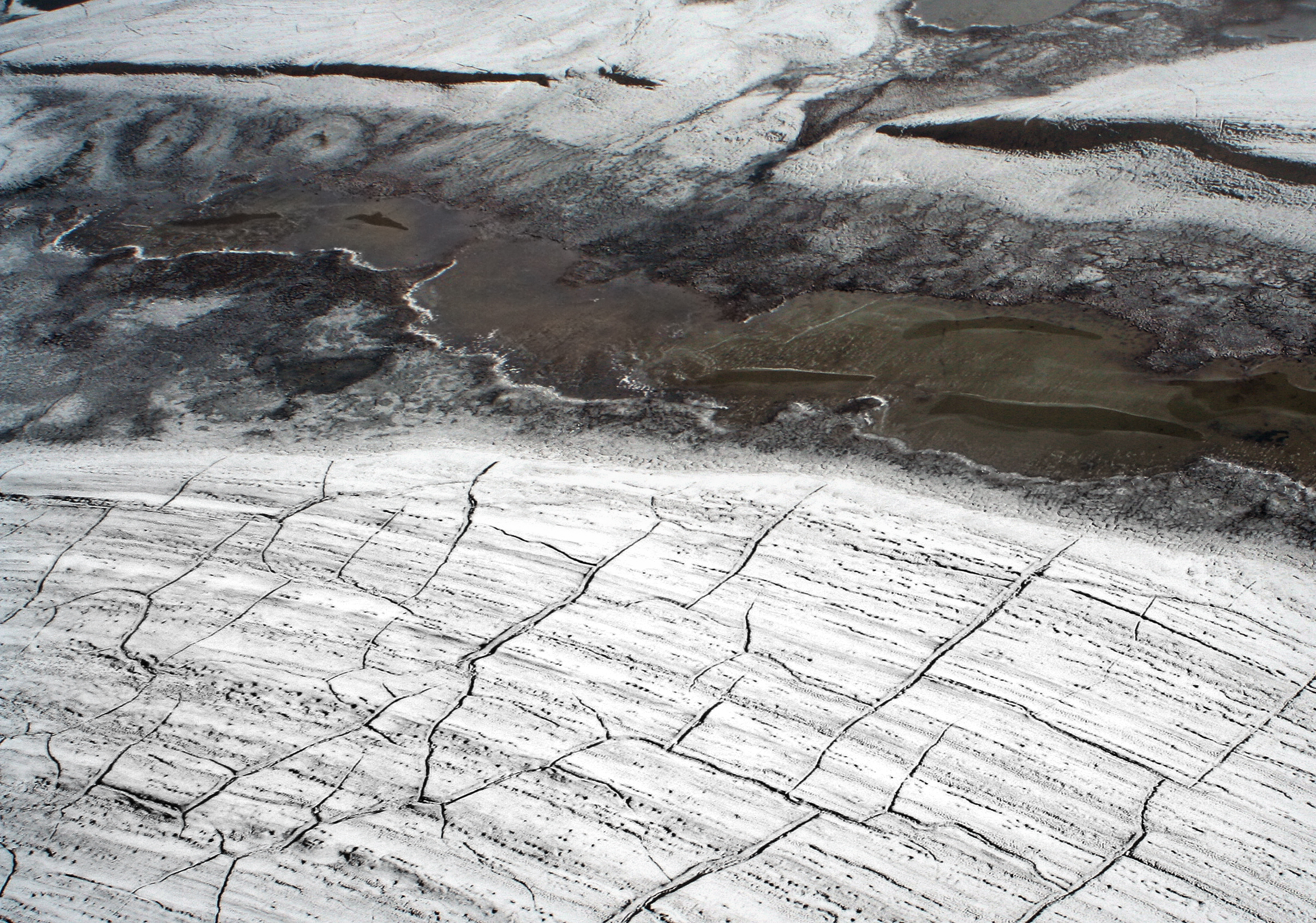
Contraction crack (ice wedge) polygons on Arctic sediment.

=== Ecology ===
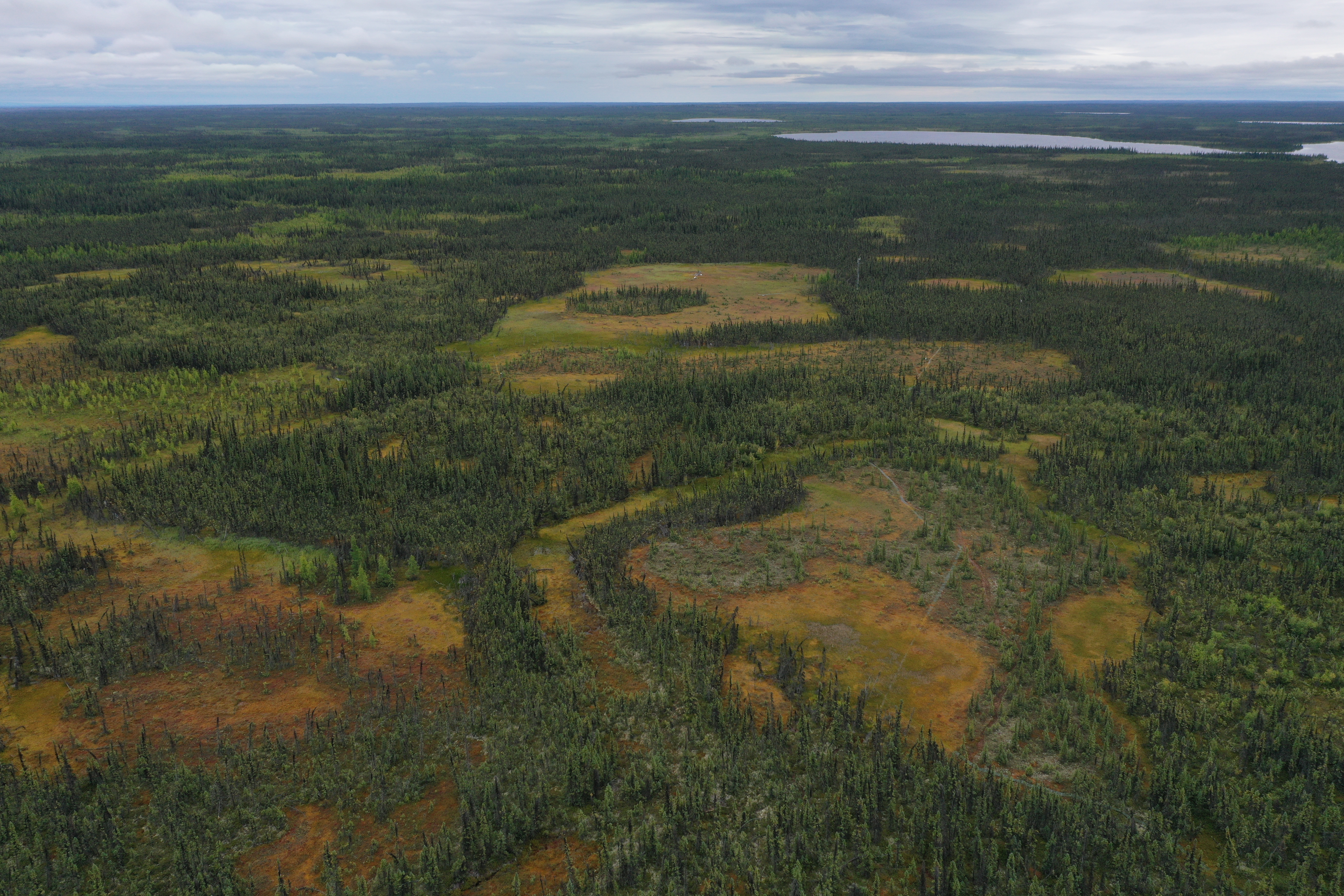
A peat plateau complex south of Fort Simpson, Northwest Territories.

Only plants with shallow roots can survive in the presence of permafrost. Black spruce tolerates limited rooting zones, and dominates flora where permafrost is extensive. Likewise, animal species which live in dens and burrows have their habitat constrained by the permafrost, and these constraints also have a secondary impact on interactions between species within the ecosystem.

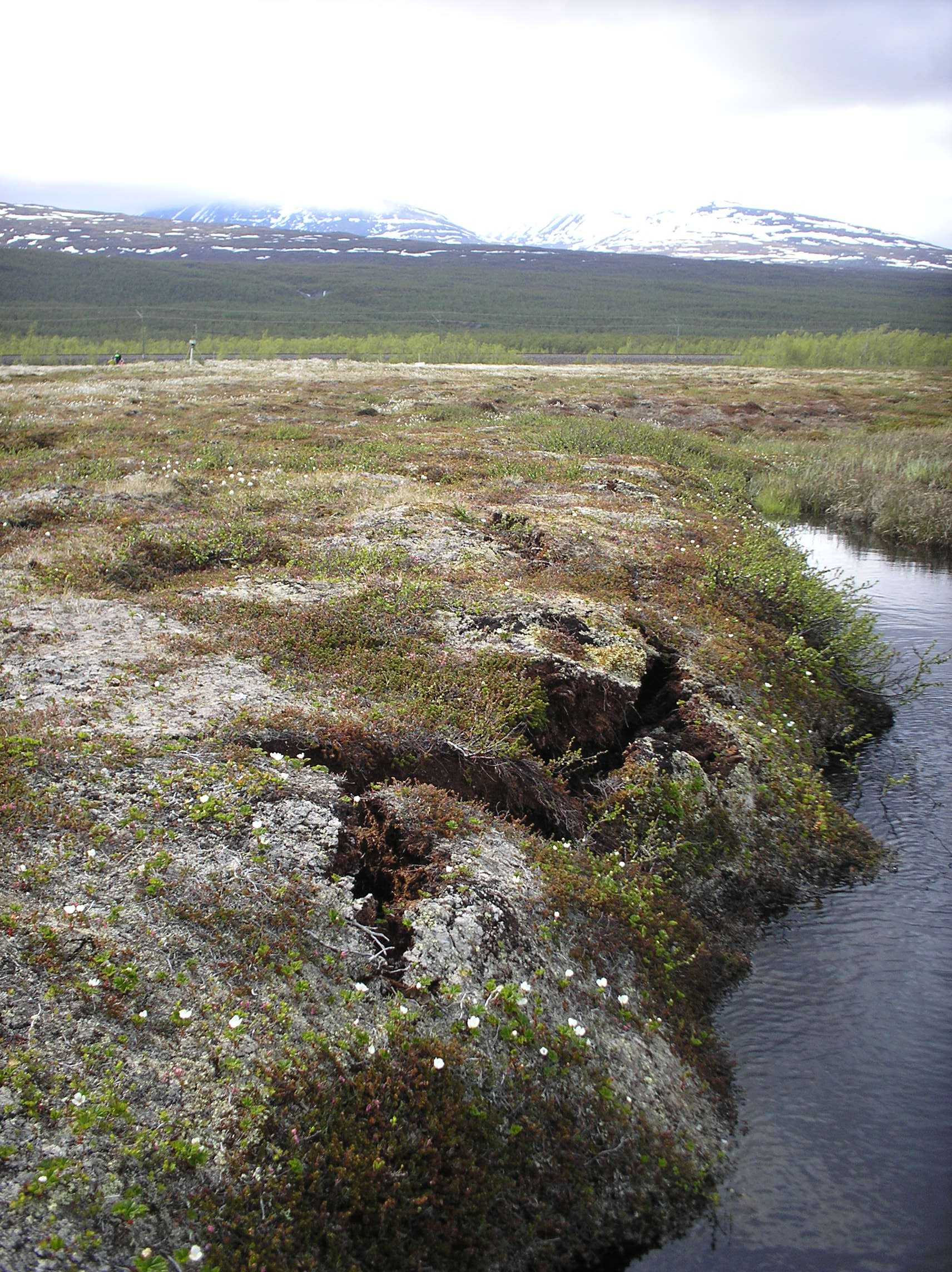
Cracks forming at the edges of the Storflaket permafrost bog in Sweden.

While permafrost soil is frozen, it is not completely inhospitable to microorganisms, though their numbers can vary widely, typically from 1 to 1000 million per gram of soil.

The permafrost carbon cycle (Arctic Carbon Cycle) deals with the transfer of carbon from permafrost soils to terrestrial vegetation and microbes, to the atmosphere, back to vegetation, and finally back to permafrost soils through burial and sedimentation due to cryogenic processes. Some of this carbon is transferred to the ocean and other portions of the globe through the global carbon cycle. The cycle includes the exchange of carbon dioxide and methane between terrestrial components and the atmosphere, as well as the transfer of carbon between land and water as methane, dissolved organic carbon, dissolved inorganic carbon, particulate inorganic carbon and particulate organic carbon.

Most of the bacteria and fungi found in permafrost cannot be cultured in the laboratory, but the identity of the microorganisms can be revealed by DNA-based techniques. For instance, analysis of 16S rRNA genes from late Pleistocene permafrost samples in eastern Siberia's Kolyma Lowland revealed eight phylotypes, which belonged to the phyla Actinomycetota and Pseudomonadota. "Muot-da-Barba-Peider", an alpine permafrost site in eastern Switzerland, was found to host a diverse microbial community in 2016. Prominent bacteria groups included phylum Acidobacteriota, Actinomycetota, AD3, Bacteroidota, Chloroflexota, Gemmatimonadota, OD1, Nitrospirota, Planctomycetota, Pseudomonadota, and Verrucomicrobiota, in addition to eukaryotic fungi like Ascomycota, Basidiomycota, and Zygomycota. In the presently living species, scientists observed a variety of adaptations for sub-zero conditions, including reduced and anaerobic metabolic processes.

=== Construction on permafrost ===
There are only two large cities in the world built in areas of continuous permafrost (where the frozen soil forms an unbroken, below-zero sheet) and both are in Russia – Norilsk in Krasnoyarsk Krai and Yakutsk in the Sakha Republic. Building on permafrost is difficult because the heat of the building (or pipeline) can spread to the soil, thawing it. As ice content turns to water, the ground's ability to provide structural support is weakened, until the building is destabilized. For instance, during the construction of the Trans-Siberian Railway, a steam engine factory complex built in 1901 began to crumble within a month of operations for these reasons. Additionally, there is no groundwater available in an area underlain with permafrost. Any substantial settlement or installation needs to make some alternative arrangement to obtain water.

A common solution is placing foundations on wood piles, a technique pioneered by Soviet engineer Mikhail Kim in Norilsk. However, warming-induced change of friction on the piles can still cause movement through creep, even as the soil remains frozen. The Melnikov Permafrost Institute in Yakutsk found that pile foundations should extend down to 15 metres (49 ft) to avoid the risk of buildings sinking. At this depth the temperature does not change with the seasons, remaining at about −5 °C (23 °F).

Two other approaches are building on an extensive gravel pad (usually 1–2 m (3 ft 3 in – 6 ft 7 in) thick); or using anhydrous ammonia heat pipes. The Trans-Alaska Pipeline System uses heat pipes built into vertical supports to prevent the pipeline from sinking and the Qingzang railway in Tibet employs a variety of methods to keep the ground cool, both in areas with frost-susceptible soil. Permafrost may necessitate special enclosures for buried utilities, called "utilidors".

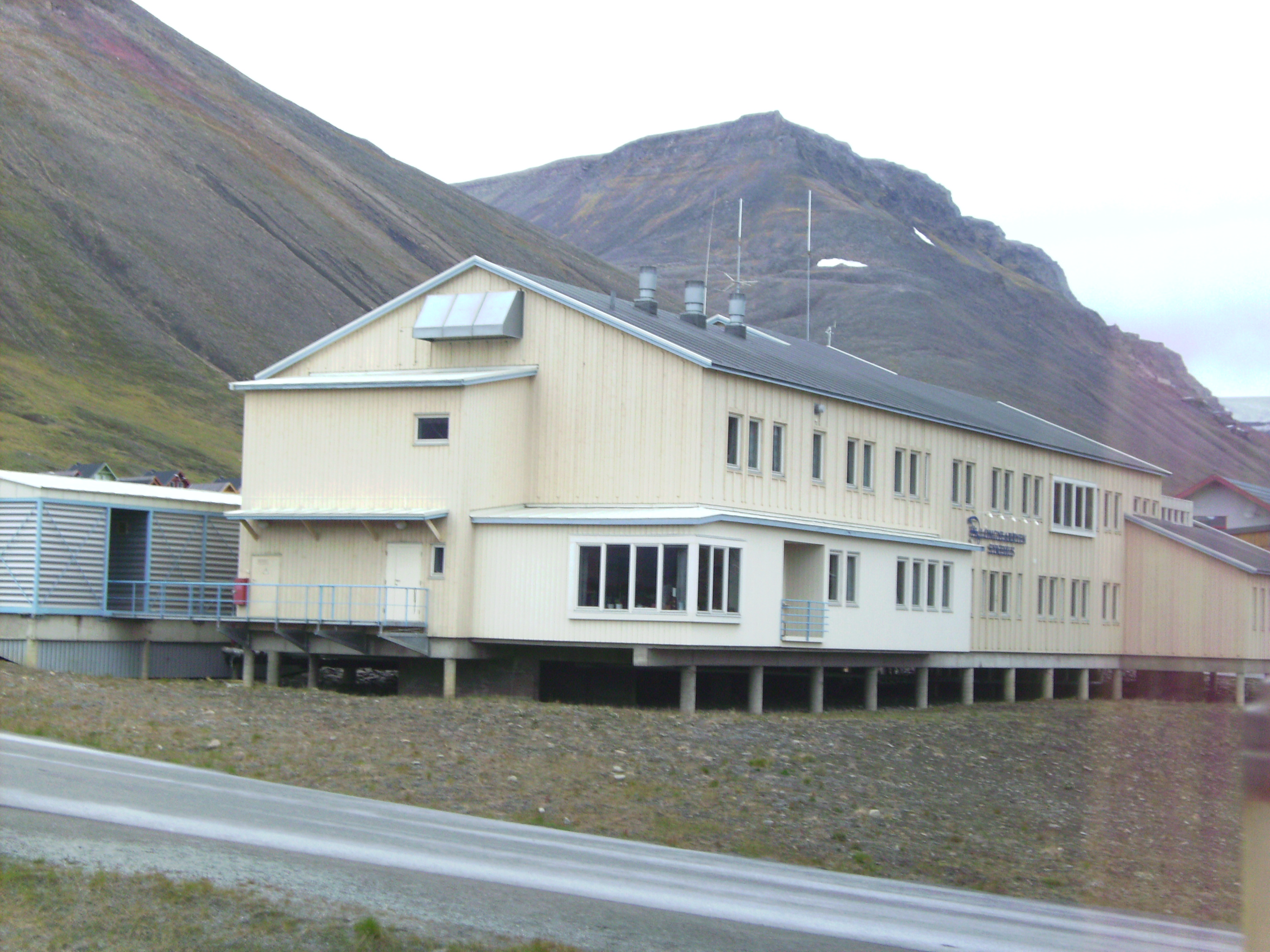
A building on elevated piles in permafrost zone.

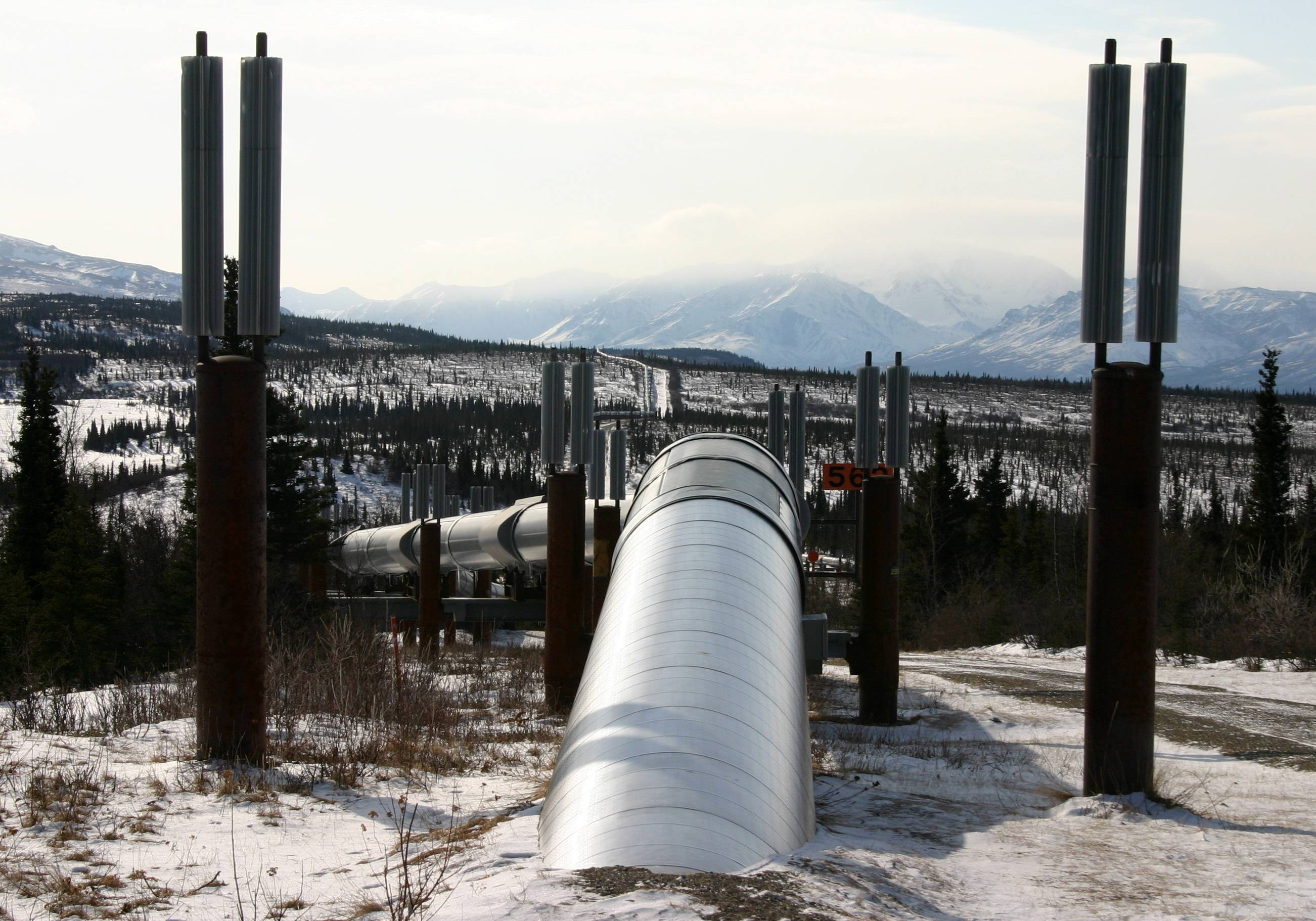
Heat pipes in vertical supports maintain a frozen bulb around portions of the Trans-Alaska Pipeline that are at risk of thawing.

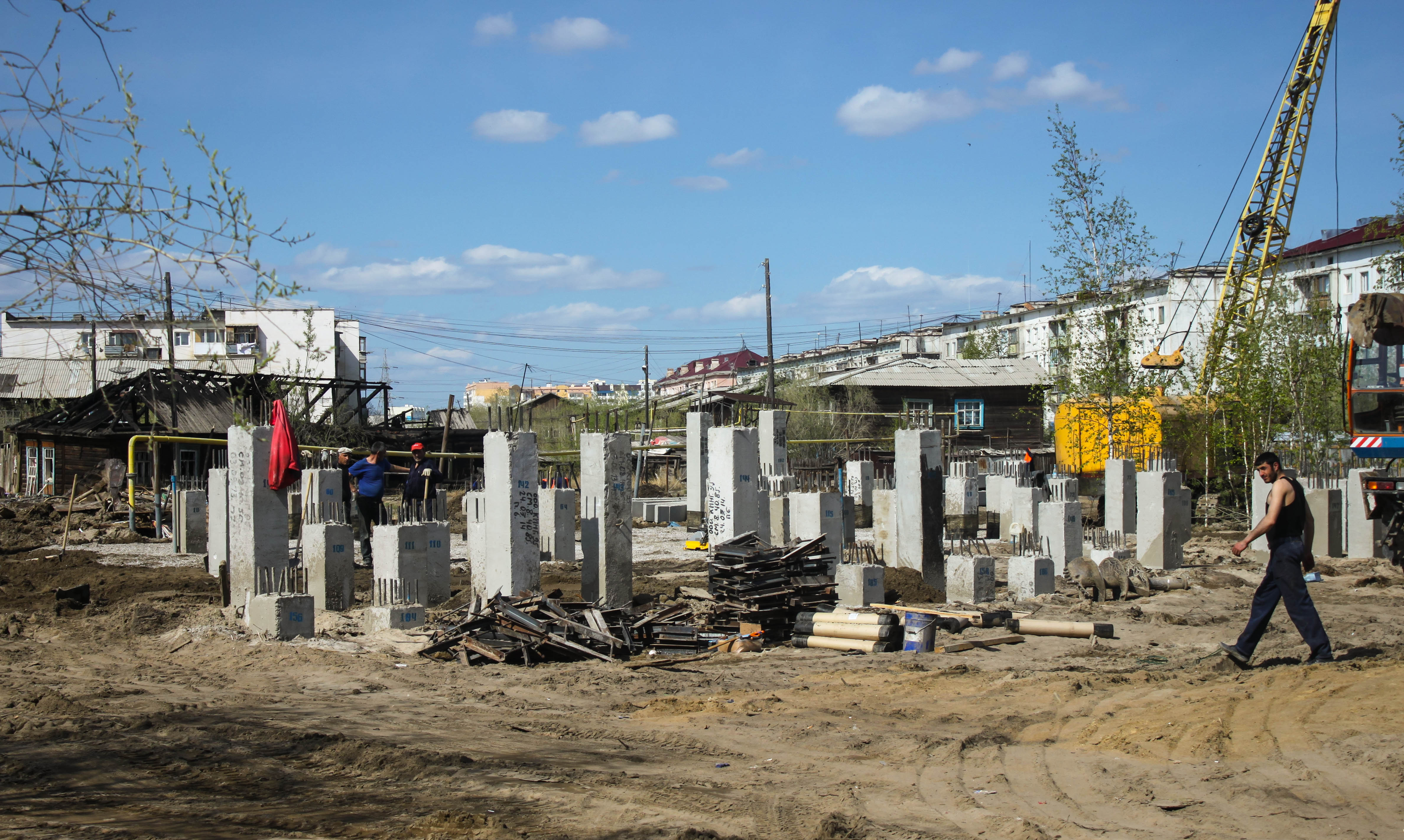
Pile foundations in Yakutsk, a city underlain with continuous permafrost.

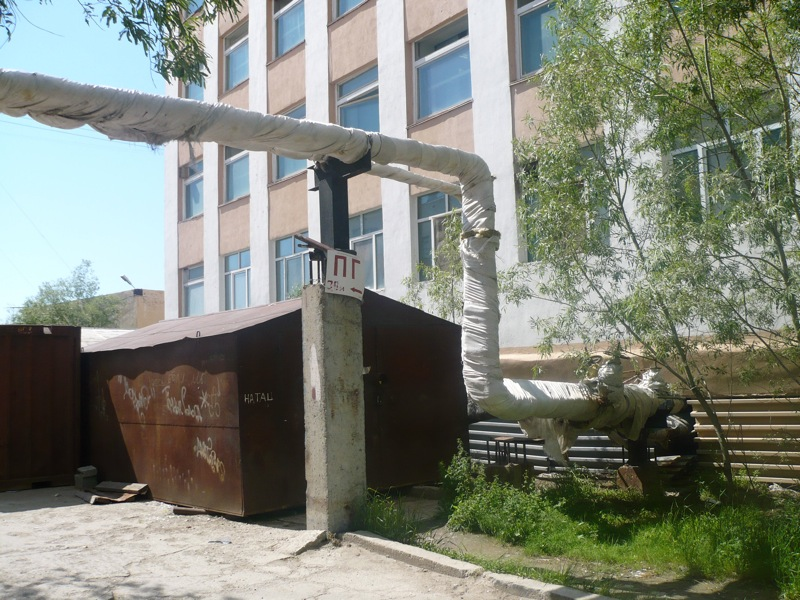
District heating pipes run above ground in Yakutsk.

== Impacts of climate change ==
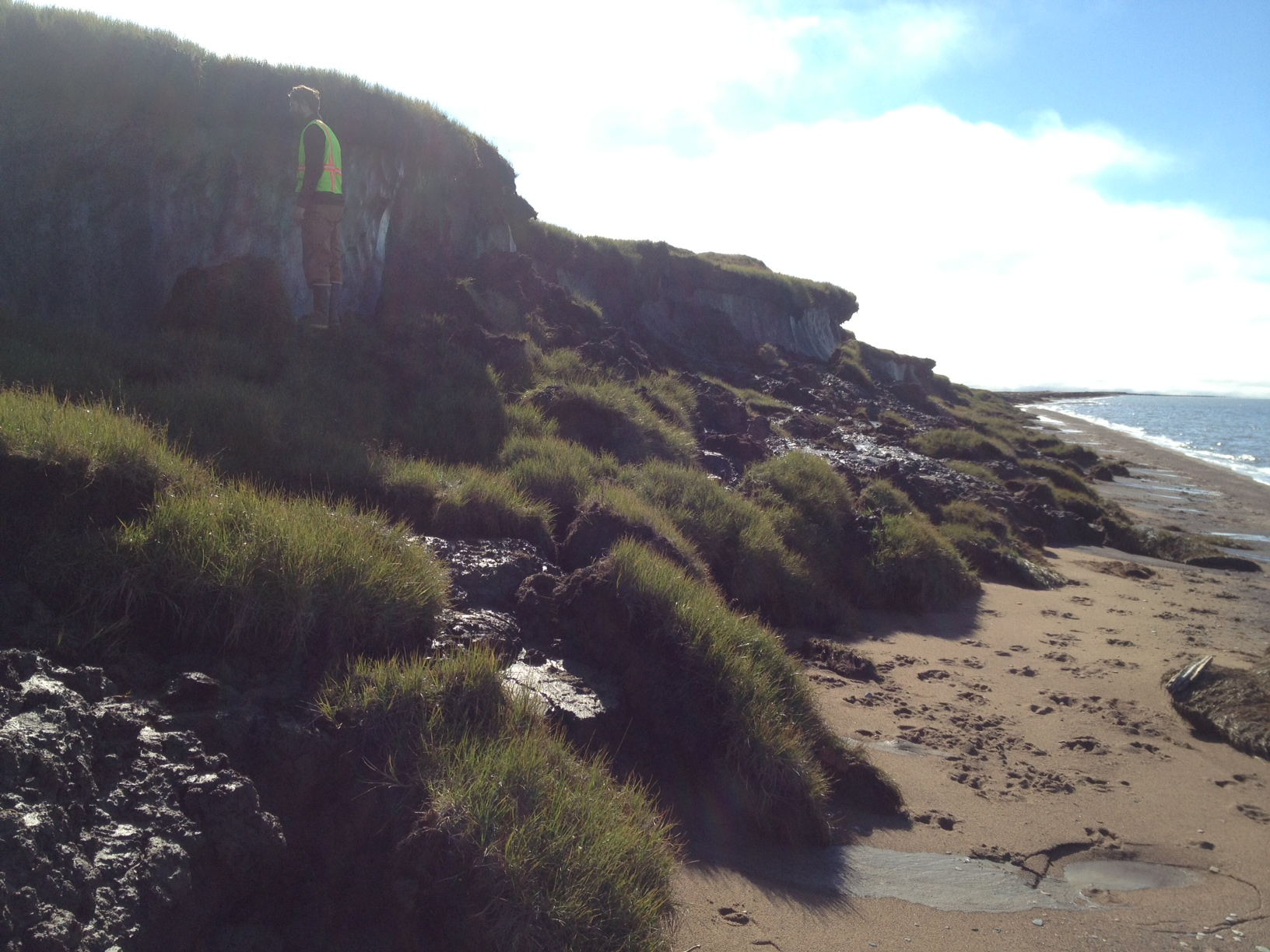
Recently thawed Arctic permafrost and coastal erosion on the Beaufort Sea, Arctic Ocean, near Point Lonely, Alaska in 2013.

=== Increasing active layer thickness ===
Globally, permafrost warmed by about 0.3 °C (0.54 °F) between 2007 and 2016, with stronger warming observed in the continuous permafrost zone relative to the discontinuous zone. Observed warming was up to 3 °C (5.4 °F) in parts of Northern Alaska (early 1980s to mid-2000s) and up to 2 °C (3.6 °F) in parts of the Russian European North (1970–2020). This warming inevitably causes permafrost to thaw: active layer thickness has increased in the European and Russian Arctic across the 21st century and at high elevation areas in Europe and Asia since the 1990s.

Between 2000 and 2018, the average active layer thickness had increased from ~127 centimetres (4.17 ft) to ~145 centimetres (4.76 ft), at an average annual rate of ~0.65 centimetres (0.26 in).

In Yukon, the zone of continuous permafrost might have moved 100 kilometres (62 mi) poleward since 1899, but accurate records only go back 30 years. The extent of subsea permafrost is decreasing as well; as of 2019, ~97% of permafrost under Arctic ice shelves is becoming warmer and thinner.

Based on high agreement across model projections, fundamental process understanding, and paleoclimate evidence, it is virtually certain that permafrost extent and volume will continue to shrink as the global climate warms, with the extent of the losses determined by the magnitude of warming.

Permafrost thaw is associated with a wide range of issues, and International Permafrost Association (IPA) exists to help address them. It convenes International Permafrost Conferences and maintains Global Terrestrial Network for Permafrost, which undertakes special projects such as preparing databases, maps, bibliographies, and glossaries, and coordinates international field programmes and networks.

=== Climate change feedback ===
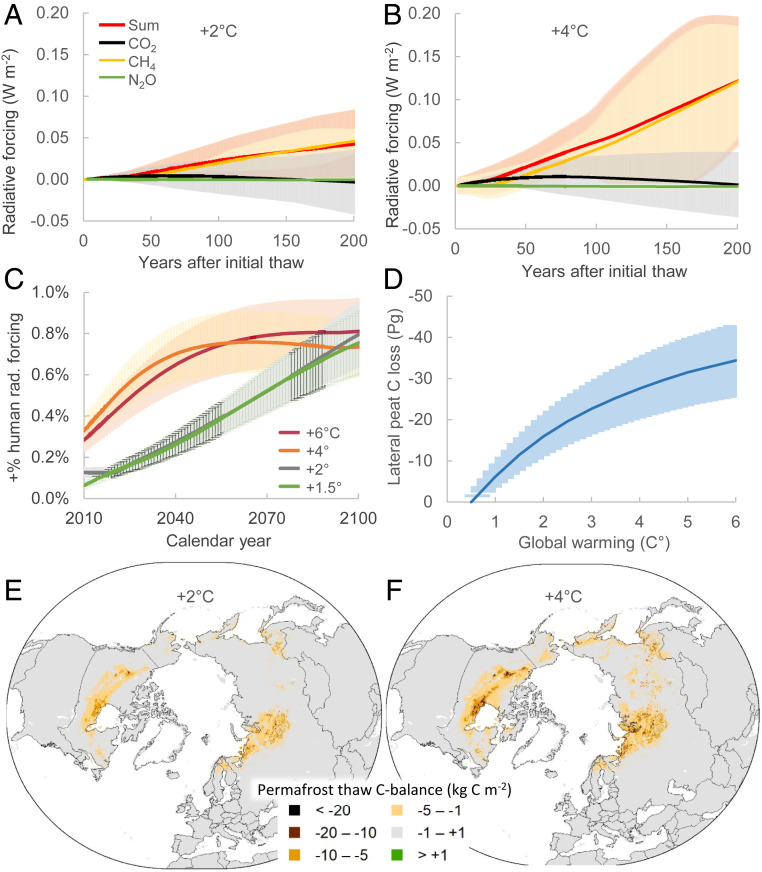
Permafrost peatlands (a smaller, carbon-rich subset of permafrost areas) under varying extent of global warming, and the resultant emissions as a fraction of anthropogenic emissions needed to cause that extent of warming.

As recent warming deepens the active layer subject to permafrost thaw, this exposes formerly stored carbon to biogenic processes which facilitate its entrance into the atmosphere as carbon dioxide and methane. Because carbon emissions from permafrost thaw contribute to the same warming which facilitates the thaw, it is a well-known example of a positive climate change feedback. Permafrost thaw is sometimes included as one of the major tipping points in the climate system due to the exhibition of local thresholds and its effective irreversibility. However, while there are self-perpetuating processes that apply on the local or regional scale, it is debated as to whether it meets the strict definition of a global tipping point as in aggregate permafrost thaw is gradual with warming.

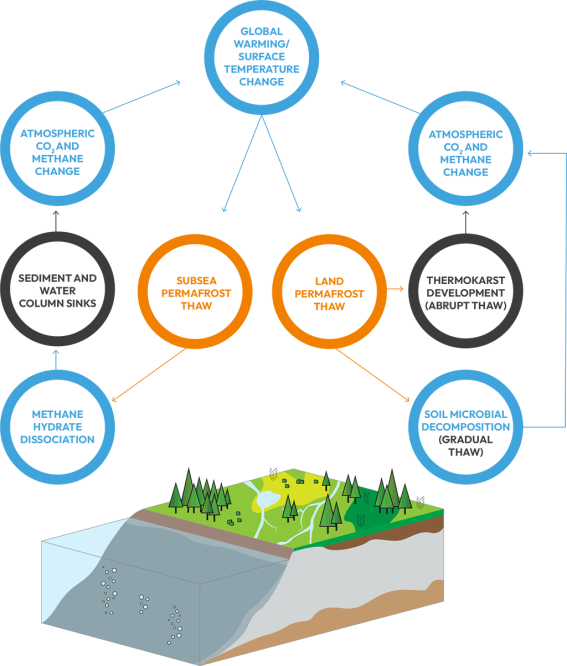
Feedback processes related to land and subsea permafrost.

In the northern circumpolar region, permafrost contains organic matter equivalent to 1400–1650 billion tons of pure carbon, which was built up over thousands of years. This amount equals almost half of all organic material in all soils, and it is about twice the carbon content of the atmosphere, or around four times larger than the human emissions of carbon between the start of the Industrial Revolution and 2011. Further, most of this carbon (~1,035 billion tons) is stored in what is defined as the near-surface permafrost, no deeper than 3 metres (9.8 ft) below the surface. However, only a fraction of this stored carbon is expected to enter the atmosphere. In general, the volume of permafrost in the upper 3 m of ground is expected to decrease by about 25% per 1 °C (1.8 °F) of global warming, yet even under the RCP8.5 scenario associated with over 4 °C (7.2 °F) of global warming by the end of the 21st century, about 5% to 15% of permafrost carbon is expected to be lost "over decades and centuries".

The exact amount of carbon that will be released due to warming in a given permafrost area depends on depth of thaw, carbon content within the thawed soil, physical changes to the environment, and microbial and vegetation activity in the soil. Notably, estimates of carbon release alone do not fully represent the impact of permafrost thaw on climate change. This is because carbon can be released through either aerobic or anaerobic respiration, which results in carbon dioxide (CO_{2}) or methane (CH_{4}) emissions, respectively. While methane lasts less than 12 years in the atmosphere, its global warming potential is around 80 times larger than that of CO_{2} over a 20-year period and about 28 times larger over a 100-year period. While only a small fraction of permafrost carbon will enter the atmosphere as methane, those emissions will cause 40–70% of the total warming caused by permafrost thaw during the 21st century. Much of the uncertainty about the eventual extent of permafrost methane emissions is caused by the difficulty of accounting for the recently discovered abrupt thaw processes, which often increase the fraction of methane emitted over carbon dioxide in comparison to the usual gradual thaw processes.

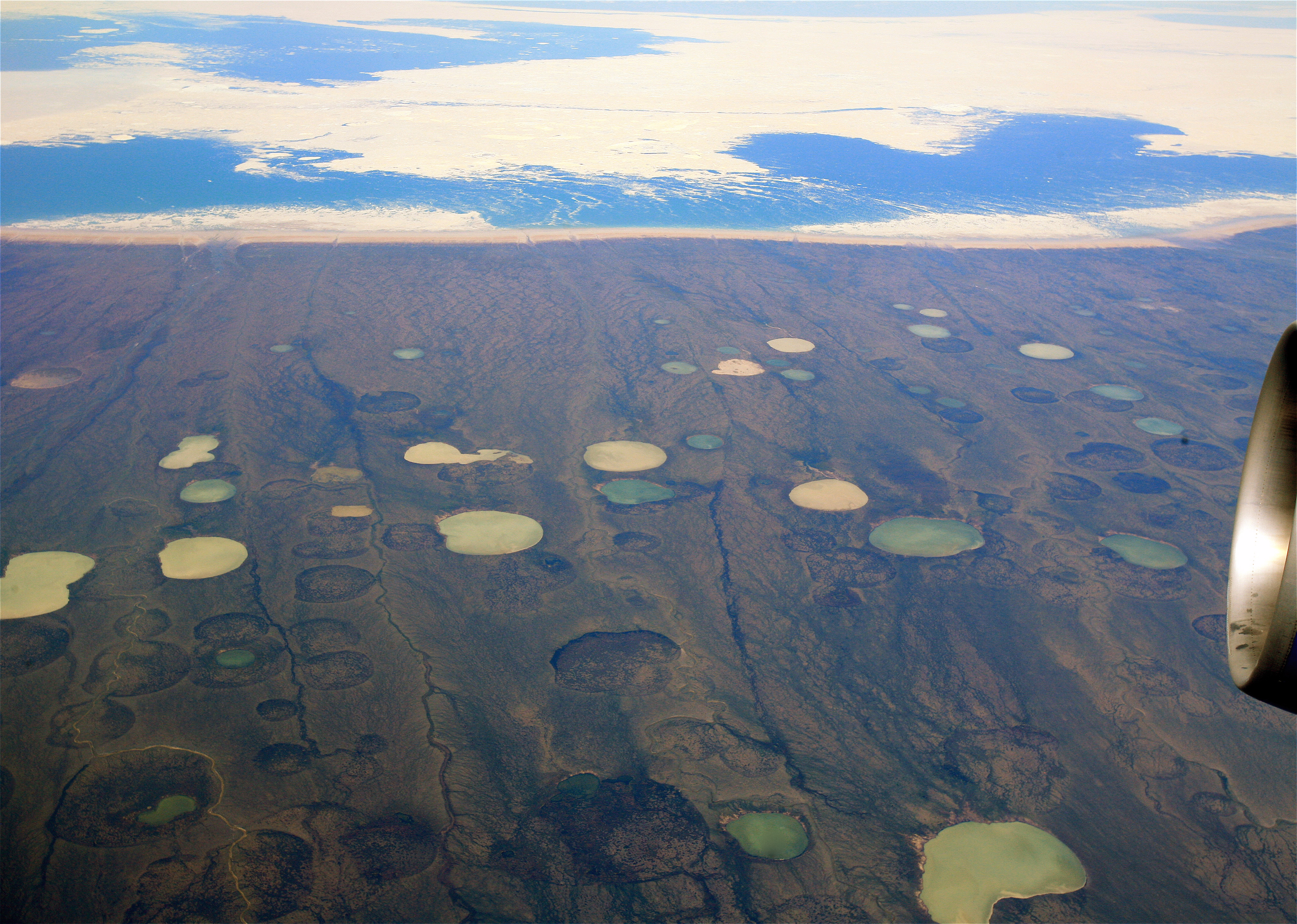
Permafrost thaw ponds on peatland in Hudson Bay, Canada in 2008.

Another factor which complicates projections of permafrost carbon emissions is the ongoing "greening" of the Arctic. As climate change warms the air and the soil, the region becomes more hospitable to plants, including larger shrubs and trees which could not survive there before. Thus, the Arctic is losing more and more of its tundra biomes, yet it gains more plants, which proceed to absorb more carbon. Some of the emissions caused by permafrost thaw will be offset by this increased plant growth, but the exact proportion is uncertain. It is considered very unlikely that this greening could offset all of the emissions from permafrost thaw during the 21st century, and even less likely that it could continue to keep pace with those emissions after the 21st century. Further, climate change also increases the risk of wildfires in the Arctic, which can substantially accelerate emissions of permafrost carbon.

==== Impact on global temperatures ====
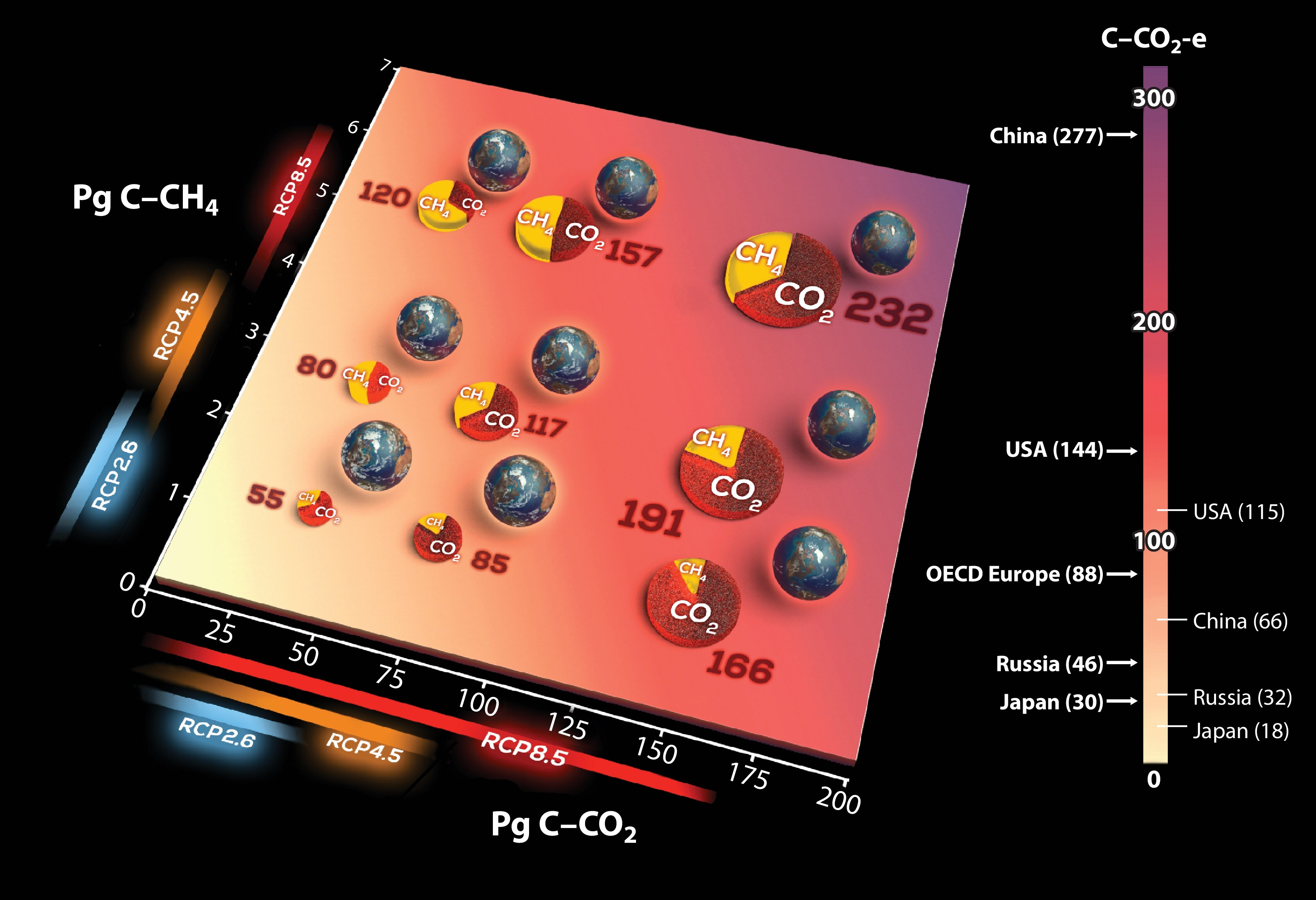
Nine probable scenarios of greenhouse gas emissions from permafrost thaw during the 21st century, which show a limited, moderate and intense CO_{2} and CH_{4} emission response to low, medium and high-emission Representative Concentration Pathways. The vertical bar uses emissions of selected large countries as a comparison: the right-hand side of the scale shows their cumulative emissions since the start of the Industrial Revolution, while the left-hand side shows each country's cumulative emissions for the rest of the 21st century if they remained unchanged from their 2019 levels.

Altogether, it is expected that cumulative greenhouse gas emissions from permafrost thaw will be smaller than the cumulative anthropogenic emissions, yet still substantial on a global scale, with some experts comparing them to emissions caused by deforestation. The IPCC Sixth Assessment Report estimates that carbon dioxide and methane released from permafrost could amount to the equivalent of 14–175 billion tonnes of carbon dioxide per 1 °C (1.8 °F) of warming. For comparison, by 2019, annual anthropogenic emissions of carbon dioxide alone stood around 40 billion tonnes. A major review published in the year 2022 concluded that if the goal of preventing 2 °C (3.6 °F) of warming was realized, then the average annual permafrost emissions throughout the 21st century would be equivalent to the year 2019 annual emissions of Russia. Under RCP4.5, a scenario considered close to the current trajectory and where the warming stays slightly below 3 °C (5.4 °F), annual permafrost emissions would be comparable to year 2019 emissions of Western Europe or the United States, while under the scenario of high global warming and worst-case permafrost feedback response, they would approach year 2019 emissions of China.

Fewer studies have attempted to describe the impact directly in terms of warming. A 2018 paper estimated that if global warming was limited to 2 °C (3.6 °F), gradual permafrost thaw would add around 0.09 °C (0.16 °F) to global temperatures by 2100, while a 2022 review concluded that every 1 °C (1.8 °F) of global warming would cause 0.04 °C (0.072 °F) and 0.11 °C (0.20 °F) from abrupt thaw by the year 2100 and 2300. Around 4 °C (7.2 °F) of global warming, abrupt (around 50 years) and widespread collapse of permafrost areas could occur, resulting in an additional warming of 0.2–0.4 °C (0.36–0.72 °F).

=== Thaw-induced ground instability ===
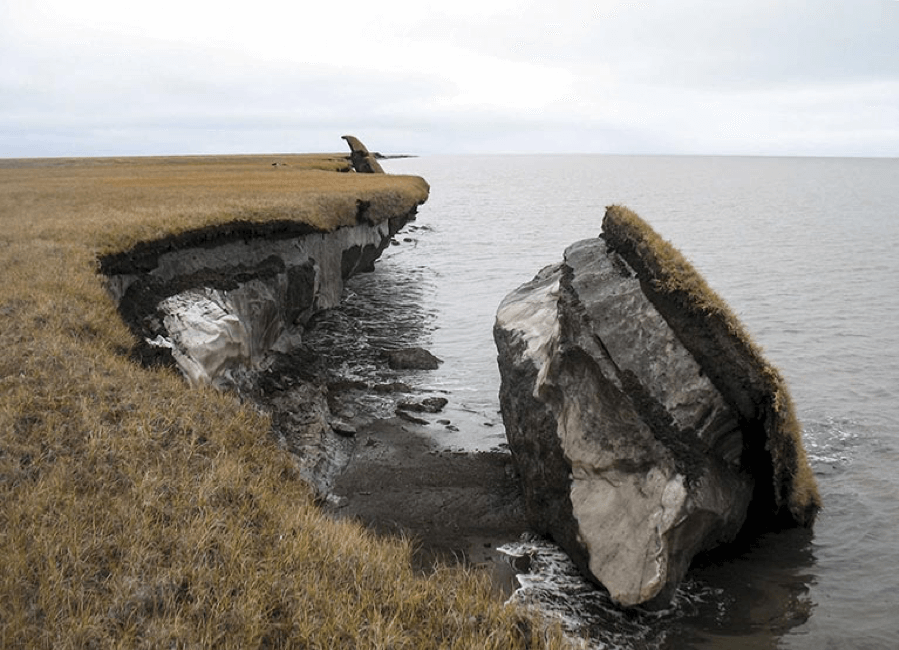
Severe coastal erosion on the Arctic Ocean coast of Alaska.

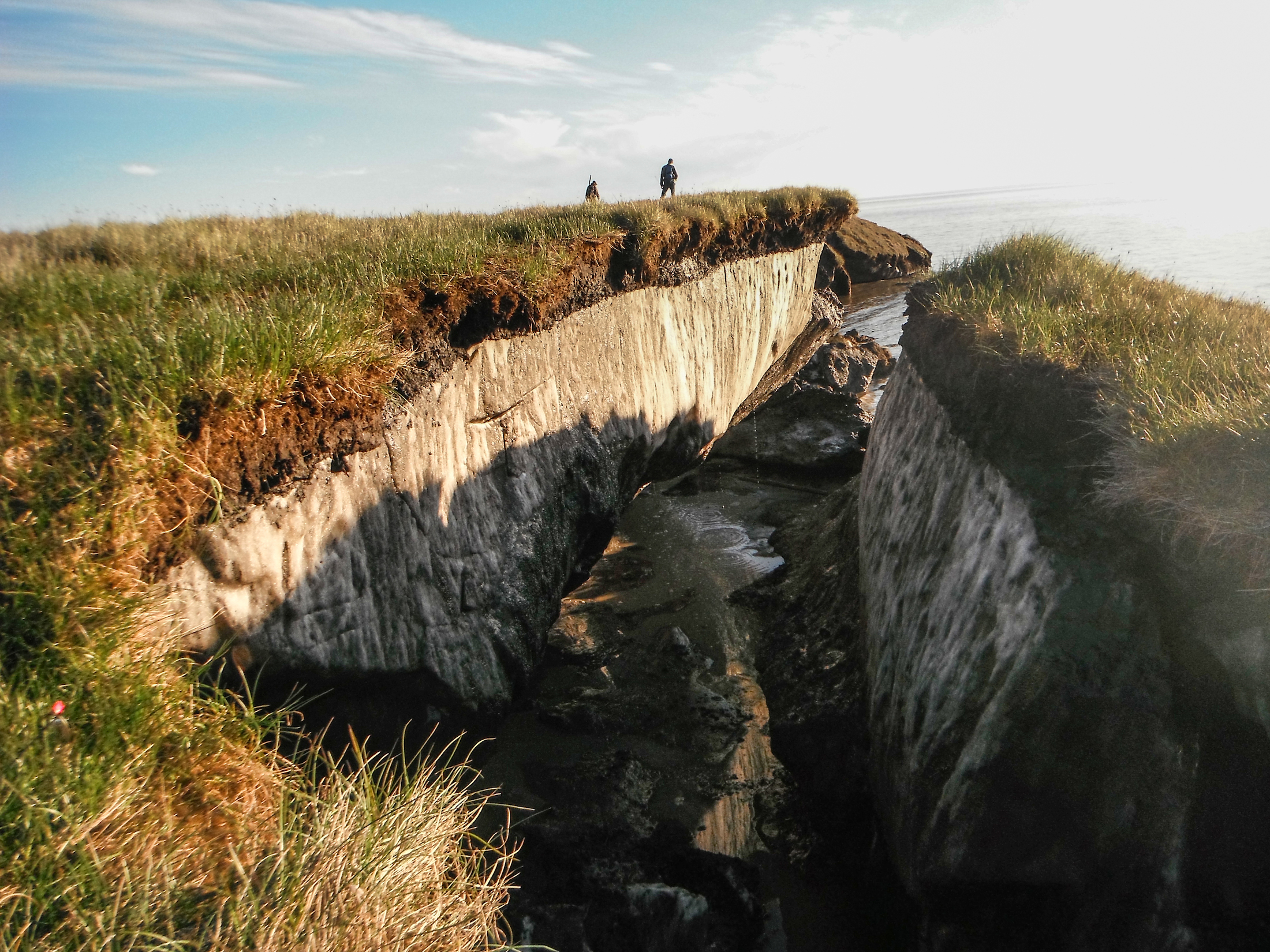
Permafrost revealed by coastal erosion in Alaska.

As the water drains or evaporates, soil structure weakens and sometimes becomes viscous until it regains strength with decreasing moisture content. One visible sign of permafrost degradation is the random displacement of trees from their vertical orientation in permafrost areas. Global warming has been increasing permafrost slope disturbances and sediment supplies to fluvial systems, resulting in exceptional increases in river sediment. On the other hands, disturbance of formerly hard soil increases drainage of water reservoirs in northern wetlands. This can dry them out and compromise the survival of plants and animals used to the wetland ecosystem.

In high mountains, much of the structural stability can be attributed to glaciers and permafrost. As climate warms, permafrost thaws, decreasing slope stability and increasing stress through buildup of pore-water pressure, which may ultimately lead to slope failure and rockfalls. Over the past century, an increasing number of alpine rock slope failure events in mountain ranges around the world have been recorded, and some have been attributed to permafrost thaw induced by climate change. The 1987 Val Pola landslide that killed 22 people in the Italian Alps is considered one such example. In 2002, massive rock and ice falls (up to 11.8 million m^{3}), earthquakes (up to 3.9 Richter), floods (up to 7.8 million m^{3} water), and rapid rock-ice flow to long distances (up to 7.5 km at 60 m/s) were attributed to slope instability in high mountain permafrost.

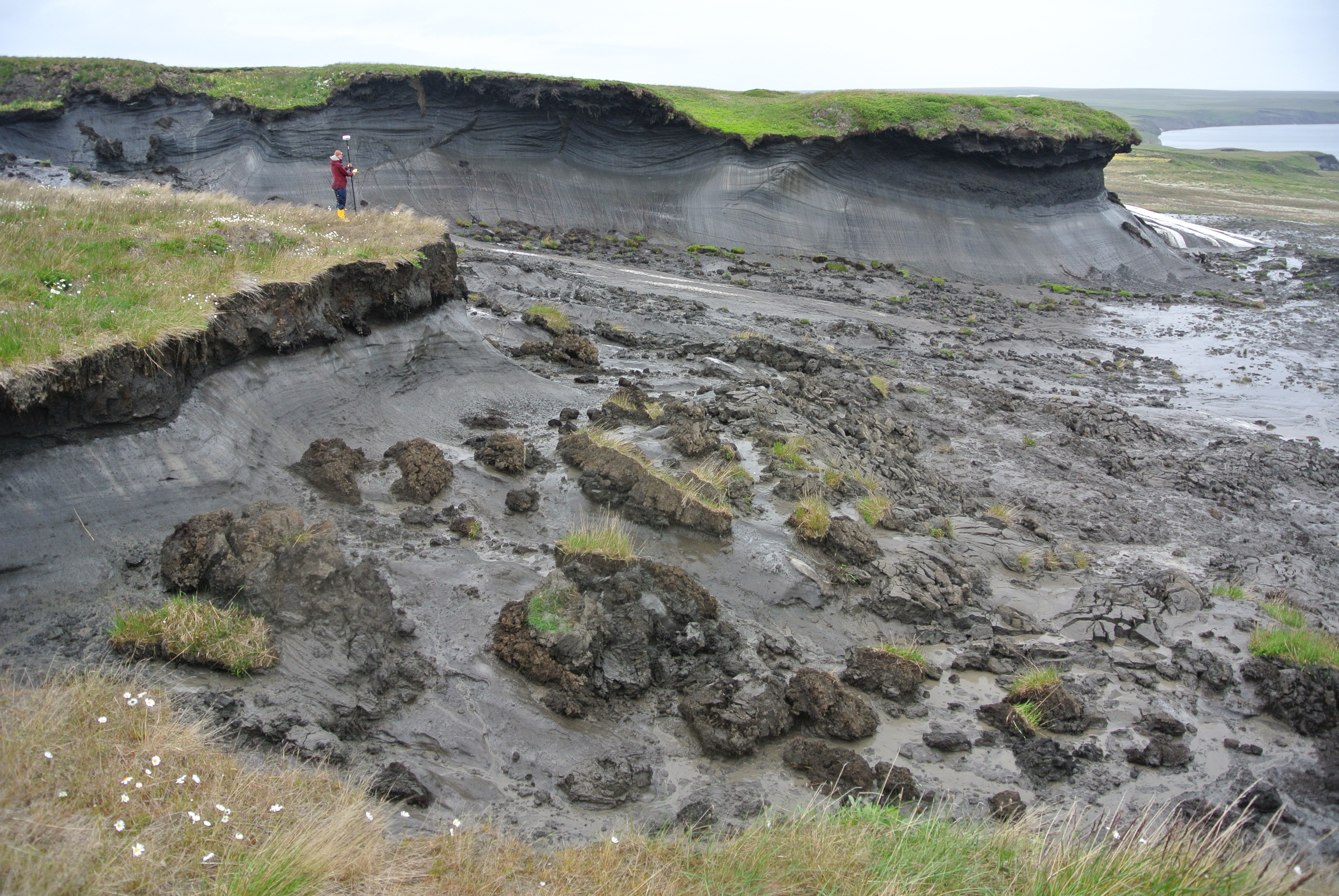
Thawing permafrost in Herschel Island, Canada, 2013.

Permafrost thaw can also result in the formation of frozen debris lobes (FDLs), which are defined as "slow-moving landslides composed of soil, rocks, trees, and ice". This is a notable issue in the Alaska's southern Brooks Range, where some FDLs measured over 100 m (110 yd) in width, 20 m (22 yd) in height, and 1,000 m (1,100 yd) in length by 2012. As of December 2021, there were 43 frozen debris lobes identified in the southern Brooks Range, where they could potentially threaten both the Trans Alaska Pipeline System (TAPS) corridor and the Dalton Highway, which is the main transport link between the Interior Alaska and the Alaska North Slope.

==== Infrastructure ====
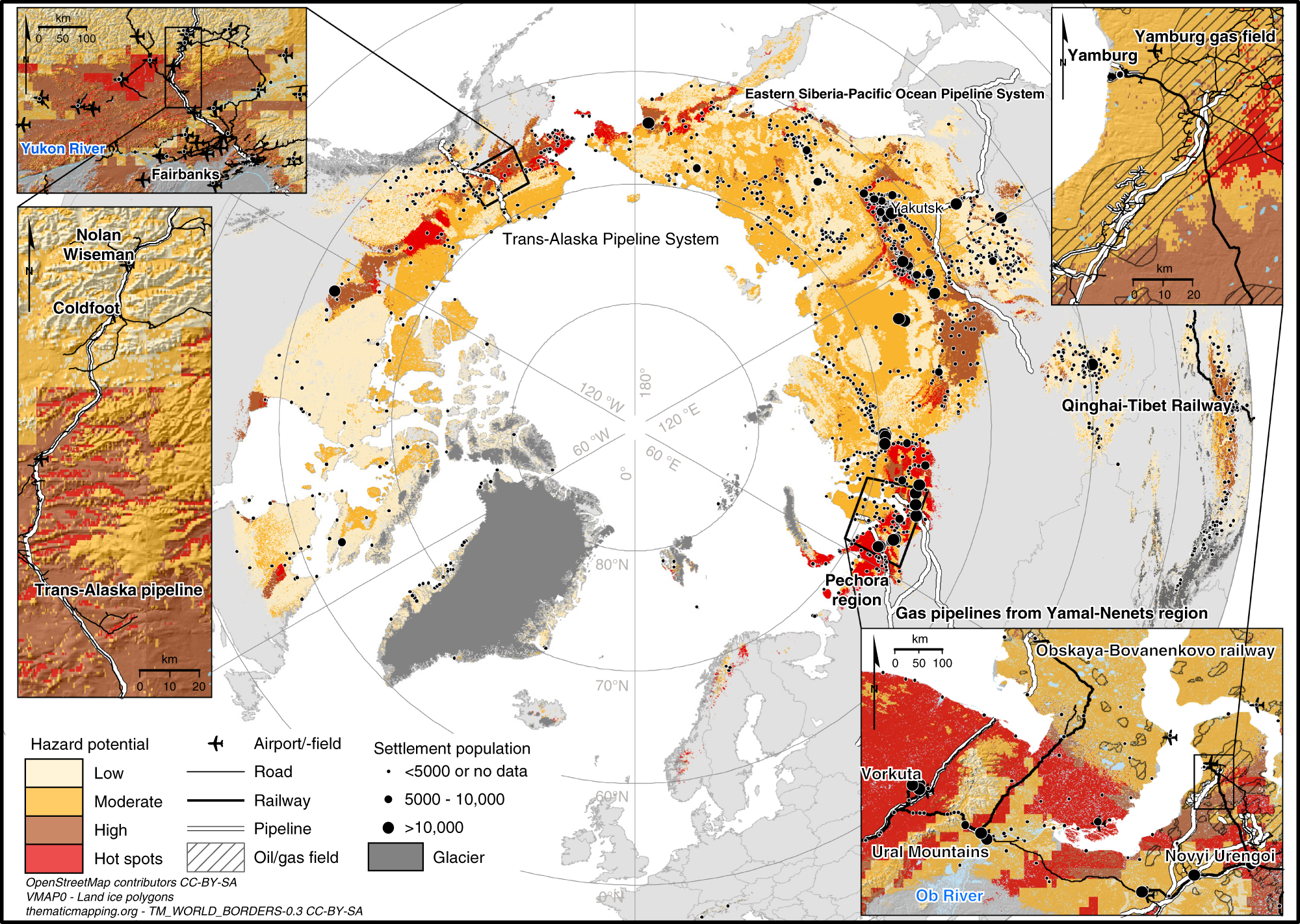
Map of likely risk to infrastructure from permafrost thaw expected to occur by 2050.

As of 2021, there are 1162 settlements located directly atop the Arctic permafrost, which host an estimated 5 million people. By 2050, permafrost layer below 42% of these settlements is expected to thaw, affecting all their inhabitants (currently 3.3 million people). Consequently, a wide range of infrastructure in permafrost areas is threatened by the thaw. By 2050, it's estimated that nearly 70% of global infrastructure located in the permafrost areas would be at high risk of permafrost thaw, including 30–50% of "critical" infrastructure. The associated costs could reach tens of billions of dollars by the second half of the century. Reducing greenhouse gas emissions in line with the Paris Agreement is projected to stabilize the risk after mid-century; otherwise, it will continue to worsen.

In Alaska alone, damages to infrastructure by the end of the century would amount to $4.6 billion (at 2015 dollar value) if RCP8.5, the high-emission climate change scenario, were realized. Over half stems from the damage to buildings ($2.8 billion), but there's also damage to roads ($700 million), railroads ($620 million), airports ($360 million) and pipelines ($170 million). Similar estimates were done for RCP4.5, a less intense scenario which leads to around 2.5 °C (4.5 °F) by 2100, a level of warming similar to the current projections. In that case, total damages from permafrost thaw are reduced to $3 billion, while damages to roads and railroads are lessened by approximately two-thirds (from $700 and $620 million to $190 and $220 million) and damages to pipelines are reduced more than ten-fold, from $170 million to $16 million. Unlike the other costs stemming from climate change in Alaska, such as damages from increased precipitation and flooding, climate change adaptation is not a viable way to reduce damages from permafrost thaw, as it would cost more than the damage incurred under either scenario.

In Canada, Northwest Territories have a population of only 45,000 people in 33 communities, yet permafrost thaw is expected to cost them $1.3 billion over 75 years, or around $51 million a year. In 2006, the cost of adapting Inuvialuit homes to permafrost thaw was estimated at $208/m^{2} if they were built at pile foundations, and $1,000/m^{2} if they didn't. At the time, the average area of a residential building in the territory was around 100 m^{2}. Thaw-induced damage is also unlikely to be covered by home insurance, and to address this reality, territorial government currently funds Contributing Assistance for Repairs and Enhancements (CARE) and Securing Assistance for Emergencies (SAFE) programs, which provide long- and short-term forgivable loans to help homeowners adapt. It is possible that in the future, mandatory relocation would instead take place as the cheaper option. However, it would effectively tear the local Inuit away from their ancestral homelands. Right now, their average personal income is only half that of the median NWT resident, meaning that adaptation costs are already disproportionate for them.

By 2022, up to 80% of buildings in some Northern Russia cities had already experienced damage. By 2050, the damage to residential infrastructure may reach $15 billion, while total public infrastructure damages could amount to 132 billion. This includes oil and gas extraction facilities, of which 45% are believed to be at risk.

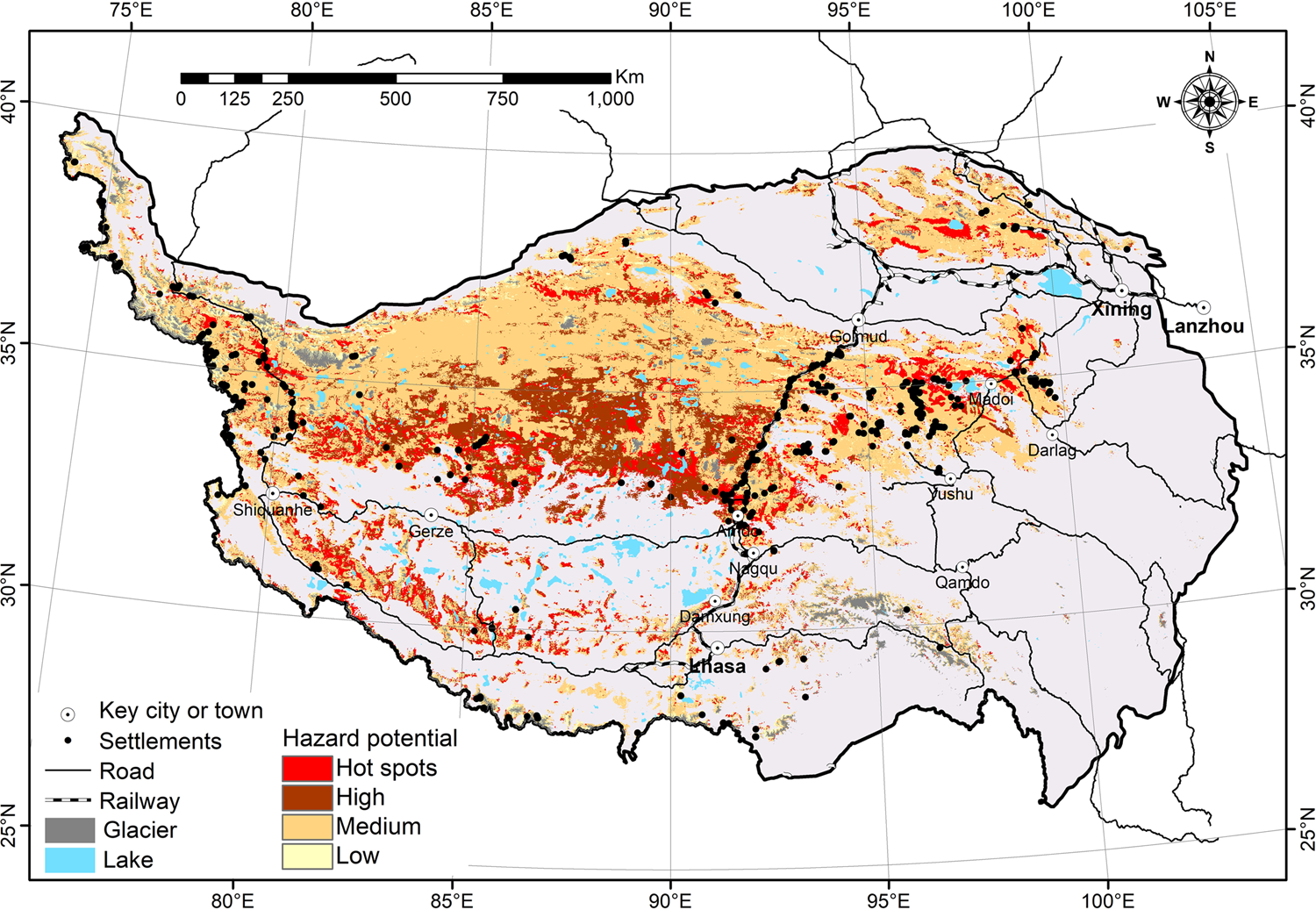
Detailed map of Qinghai–Tibet Plateau infrastructure at risk from permafrost thaw under the SSP2-4.5 scenario.

Outside of the Arctic, Qinghai–Tibet Plateau (sometimes known as "the Third Pole"), also has an extensive permafrost area. It is warming at twice the global average rate, and 40% of it is already considered "warm" permafrost, making it particularly unstable. Qinghai–Tibet Plateau has a population of over 10 million people – double the population of permafrost regions in the Arctic – and over 1 million m^{2} of buildings are located in its permafrost area, as well as 2,631 km of power lines, and 580 km of railways. There are also 9,389 km of roads, and around 30% are already sustaining damage from permafrost thaw. Estimates suggest that under the scenario most similar to today, SSP2-4.5, around 60% of the current infrastructure would be at high risk by 2090 and simply maintaining it would cost $6.31 billion, with adaptation reducing these costs by 20.9% at most. Holding the global warming to 2 °C (3.6 °F) would reduce these costs to $5.65 billion, and fulfilling the optimistic Paris Agreement target of 1.5 °C (2.7 °F) would save a further $1.32 billion. In particular, fewer than 20% of railways would be at high risk by 2100 under 1.5 °C (2.7 °F), yet this increases to 60% at 2 °C (3.6 °F), while under SSP5-8.5, this level of risk is met by mid-century.

=== Release of toxic pollutants ===
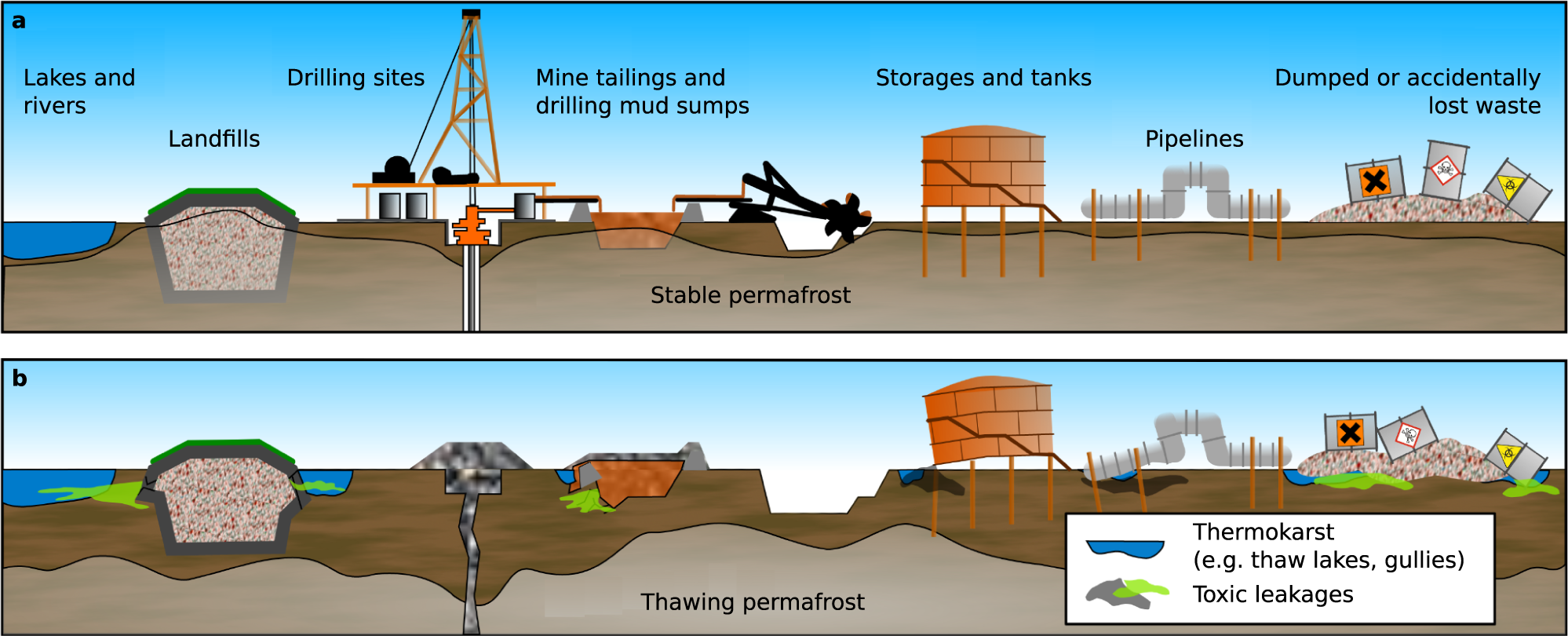
Graphical representation of leaks from various toxic hazards caused by the thaw of formerly stable permafrost.

For much of the 20th century, it was believed that permafrost would "indefinitely" preserve anything buried there, and this made deep permafrost areas popular locations for hazardous waste disposal. In places like Alaska's Prudhoe Bay oil field, procedures were developed documenting the "appropriate" way to inject waste beneath the permafrost. This means that as of 2023, there are ~4500 industrial facilities in the Arctic permafrost areas which either actively process or store hazardous chemicals. Additionally, there are between 13,000 and 20,000 sites which have been heavily contaminated, 70% of them in Russia, and their pollution is currently trapped in the permafrost.

About a fifth of both the industrial and the polluted sites (1000 and 2200–4800) are expected to start thawing in the future even if the warming does not increase from its 2020 levels. Only about 3% more sites would start thawing between now and 2050 under the climate change scenario consistent with the Paris Agreement goals, RCP2.6, but by 2100, about 1100 more industrial facilities and 3500 to 5200 contaminated sites are expected to start thawing even then. Under the very high emission scenario RCP8.5, 46% of industrial and contaminated sites would start thawing by 2050, and virtually all of them would be affected by the thaw by 2100.

Organochlorines and other persistent organic pollutants are of a particular concern, due to their potential to repeatedly reach local communities after their re-release through biomagnification in fish. At worst, future generations born in the Arctic would enter life with weakened immune systems due to pollutants accumulating across generations.

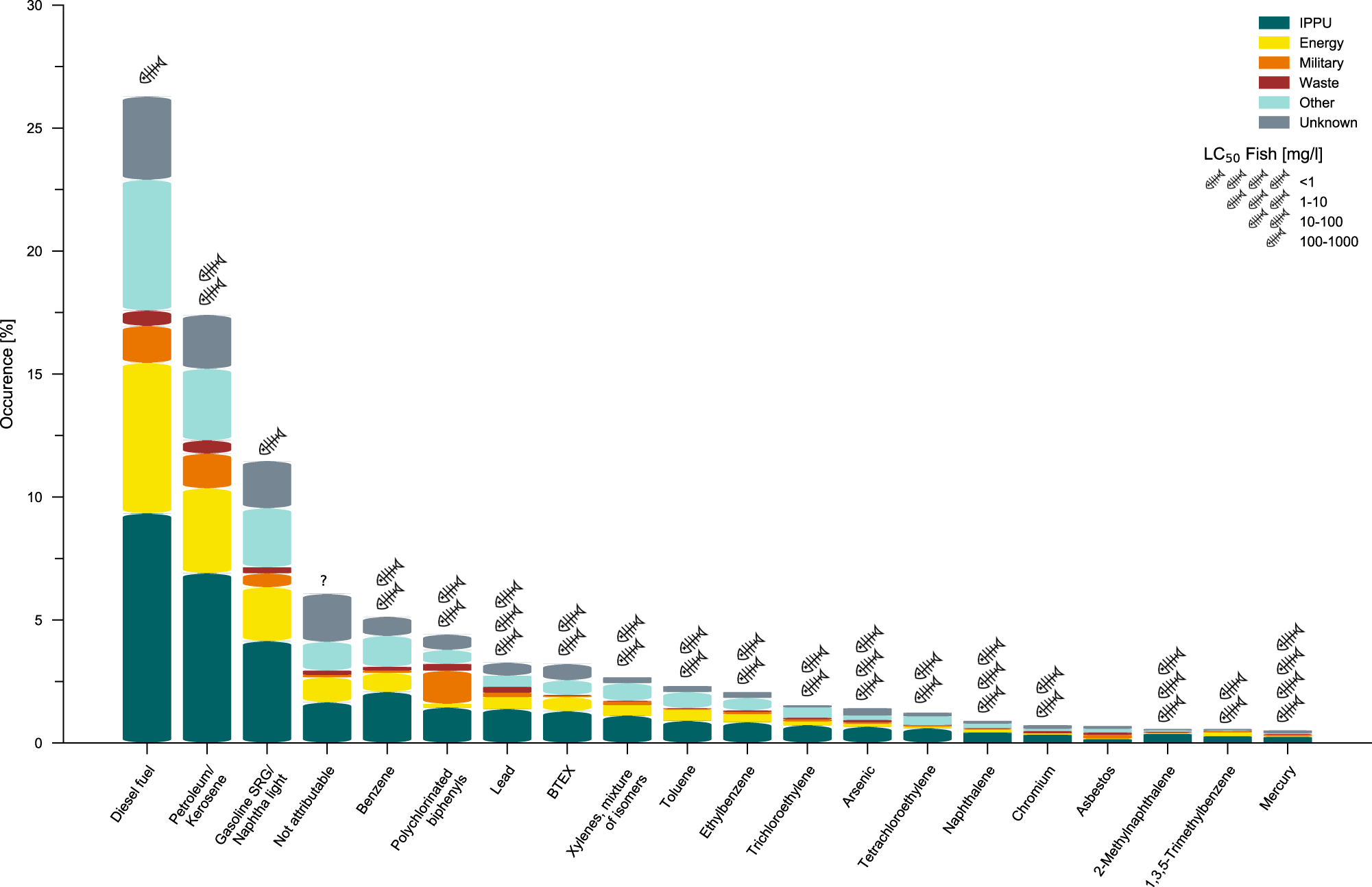
Distribution of toxic substances currently located at various permafrost sites in Alaska, by sector. The number of fish skeletons represents the toxicity of each substance.

A notable example of pollution risks associated with permafrost was the 2020 Norilsk oil spill, caused by the collapse of diesel fuel storage tank at Norilsk-Taimyr Energy's thermal power plant No. 3. It spilled 6,000 tonnes of fuel into the land and 15,000 into the water, polluting Ambarnaya, Daldykan and many smaller rivers on Taimyr Peninsula, even reaching lake Pyasino, which is a crucial water source in the area. State of emergency at the federal level was declared. The event has been described as the second-largest oil spill in modern Russian history.

Another issue associated with permafrost thaw is the release of natural mercury deposits. An estimated 800,000 tons of mercury are frozen in the permafrost soil. According to observations, around 70% of it is simply taken up by vegetation after the thaw. However, if the warming continues under RCP8.5, then permafrost emissions of mercury into the atmosphere would match the current global emissions from all human activities by 2200. Mercury-rich soils also pose a much greater threat to humans and the environment if they thaw near rivers. Under RCP8.5, enough mercury will enter the Yukon River basin by 2050 to make its fish unsafe to eat under the EPA guidelines. By 2100, mercury concentrations in the river will double. Contrastingly, even if mitigation is limited to RCP4.5 scenario, mercury levels will increase by about 14% by 2100, and will not breach the EPA guidelines even by 2300.

=== Revival of ancient organisms ===
==== Microorganisms ====
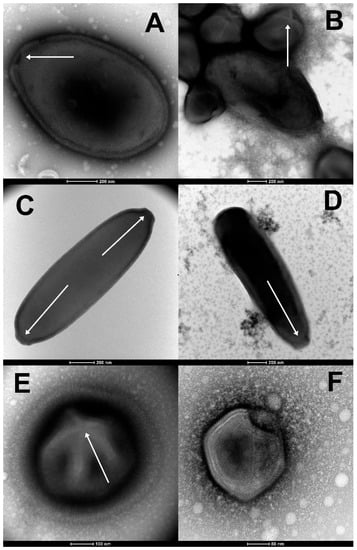
Some of the ancient amoeba-eating viruses revived by the research team of Jean-Michel Claverie. Clockwise from the top: Pandoravirus yedoma; Pandoravirus mammoth and Megavirus mammoth; Cedratvirus lena; Pithovirus mammoth; Megavirus mammoth; Pacmanvirus lupus.

Bacteria are known for being able to remain dormant to survive adverse conditions, and viruses are not metabolically active outside of host cells in the first place. This has motivated concerns that permafrost thaw could free previously unknown microorganisms, which may be capable of infecting either humans or important livestock and crops, potentially resulting in damaging epidemics or pandemics. Further, some scientists argue that horizontal gene transfer could occur between the older, formerly frozen bacteria, and modern ones, and one outcome could be the introduction of novel antibiotic resistance genes into the genome of current pathogens, exacerbating what is already expected to become a difficult issue in the future.

At the same time, notable pathogens like influenza and smallpox appear unable to survive being thawed, and other scientists argue that the risk of ancient microorganisms being both able to survive the thaw and to threaten humans is not scientifically plausible. Likewise, some research suggests that antimicrobial resistance capabilities of ancient bacteria would be comparable to, or even inferior to modern ones.

==== Plants ====
In 2012, Russian researchers proved that permafrost could serve as a natural repository for ancient life forms by reviving a sample of Silene stenophylla from 30,000-year-old tissue found in an Ice Age squirrel burrow in the Siberian permafrost. This is the oldest plant tissue ever revived. The resultant plant was fertile, producing white flowers and viable seeds. The study demonstrated that living tissue can survive ice preservation for tens of thousands of years.

== History of scientific research ==
Between the middle of the 19th century and the middle of the 20th century, most of the literature on basic permafrost science and the engineering aspects of permafrost was written in Russian. One of the earliest written reports describing the existence of permafrost dates to 1684, when well excavation efforts in Yakutsk were stumped by its presence. A significant role in the initial permafrost research was played by Alexander von Middendorff (1815–1894) and Karl Ernst von Baer, a Baltic German scientist at the University of Königsberg, and a member of the St Petersburg Academy of Sciences. Baer began publishing works on permafrost in 1838 and is often considered the "founder of scientific permafrost research." Baer laid the foundation for modern permafrost terminology by compiling and analyzing all available data on ground ice and permafrost.

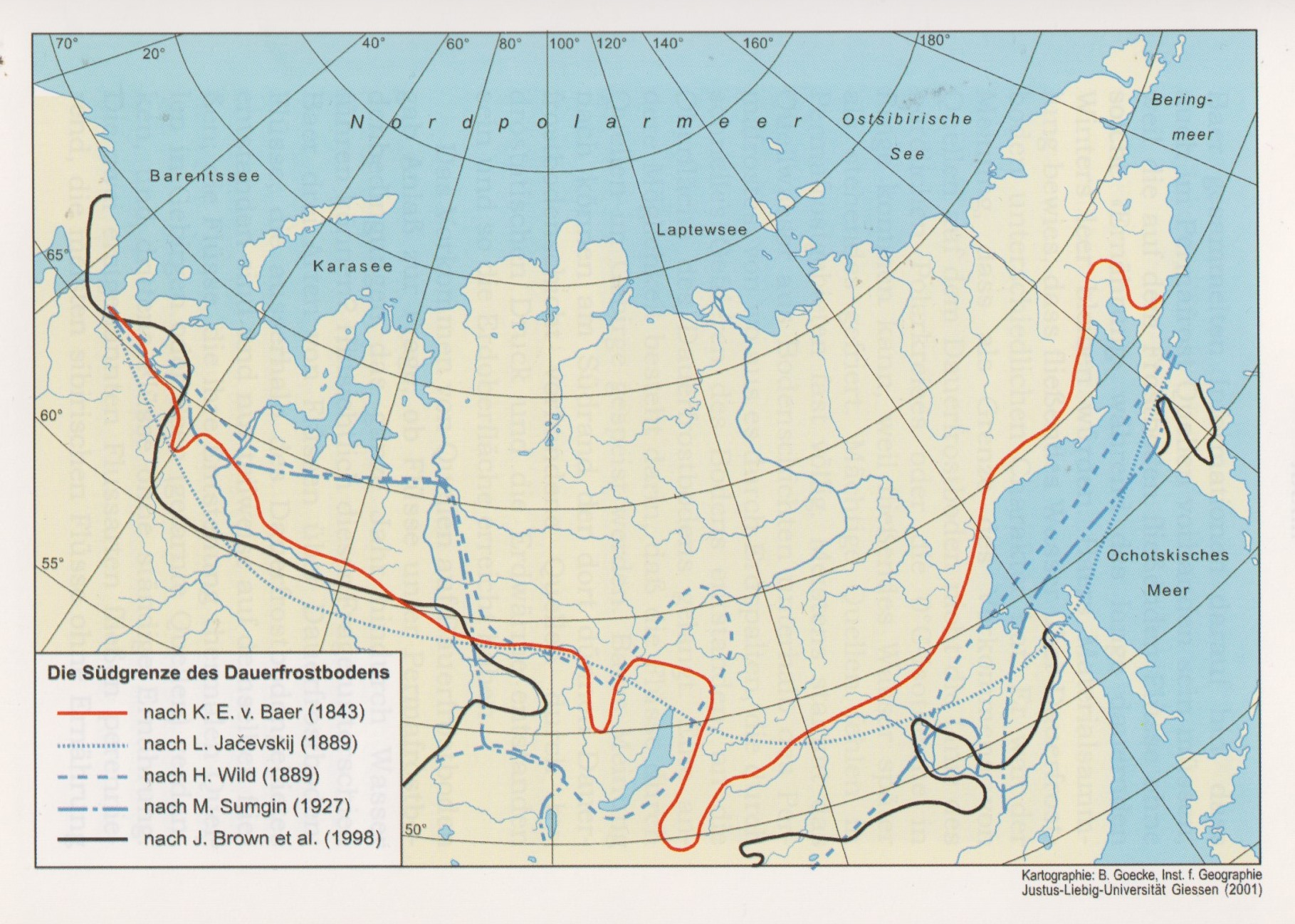
Southern limit of permafrost in Eurasia according to Karl Ernst von Baer (1843), and other authors.

Baer is also known to have composed the world's first permafrost textbook in 1843, Materialien zur Kenntniss des unvergänglichen Boden-Eises in Sibirien (Materials for the study of the perennial ground-ice in Siberia), written in his native German. However, it was not printed then, and a Russian translation was not ready until 1942. The original German textbook was believed to be lost until the typescript from 1843 was discovered in the library archives of the University of Giessen. The 234-page text was available online, with additional maps, preface and comments. Notably, Baer's southern limit of permafrost in Eurasia drawn in 1843 corresponds well with the actual southern limit verified by modern research.

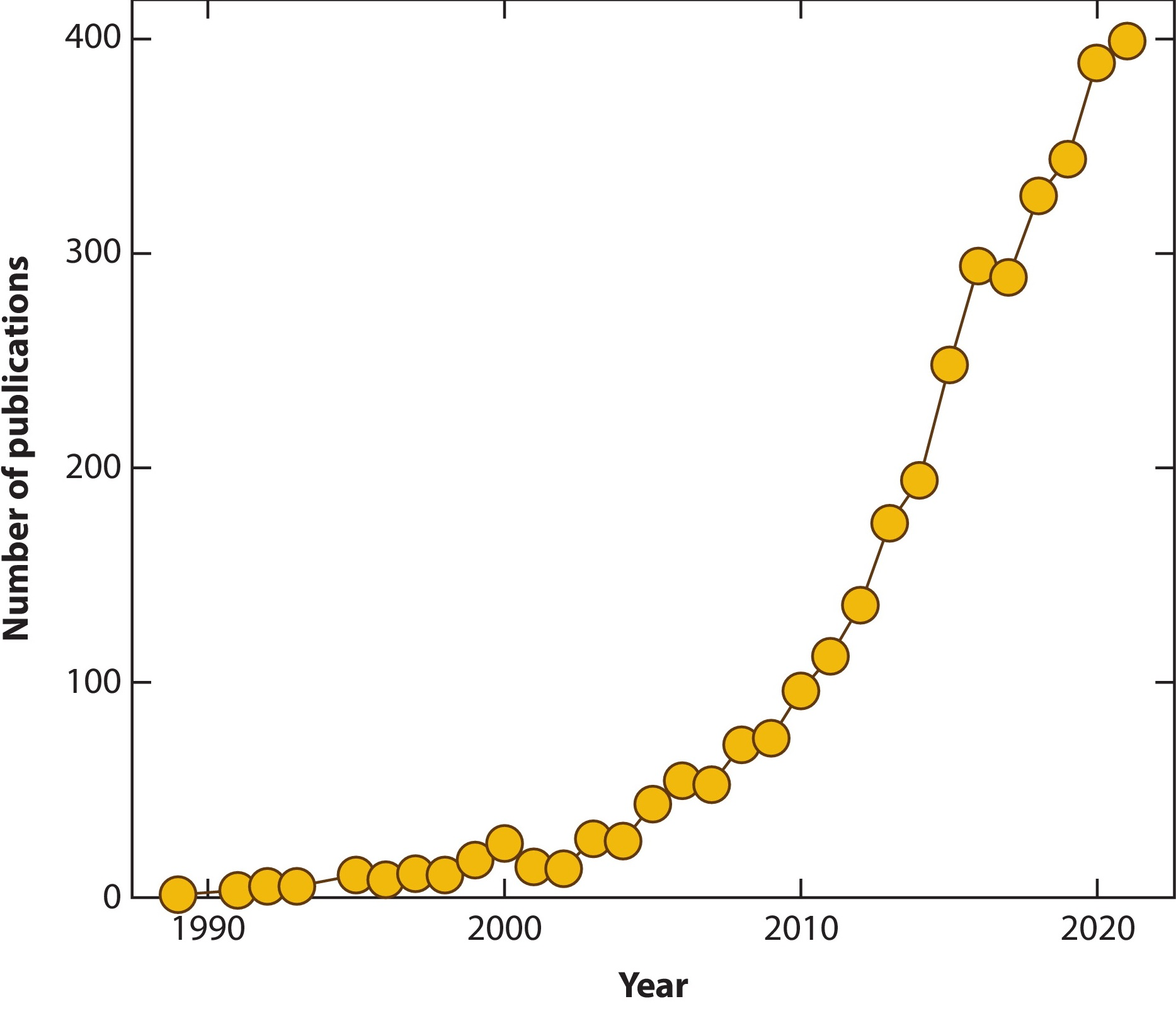
The annual number of scientific research papers published on the subject of permafrost carbon has grown from next to nothing around 1990 to around 400 by 2020.

Beginning in 1942, Siemon William Muller delved into the relevant Russian literature held by the Library of Congress and the U.S. Geological Survey Library so that he was able to furnish the government an engineering field guide and a technical report about permafrost by 1943. That report coined the English term as a contraction of permanently frozen ground, in what was considered a direct translation of the Russian term vechnaia merzlota (Russian: вечная мерзлота). In 1953, this translation was criticized by another USGS researcher Inna Poiré, as she believed the term had created unrealistic expectations about its stability: more recently, some researchers have argued that "perpetually refreezing" would be a more suitable translation. The report itself was classified (as U.S. Army. Office of the Chief of Engineers, Strategic Engineering Study, no. 62, 1943), until a revised version was released in 1947, which is regarded as the first North American treatise on the subject.

Between 11 and 15 November 1963, the First International Conference on Permafrost took place on the grounds of Purdue University in the American town of West Lafayette, Indiana. It involved 285 participants (including "engineers, manufacturers and builders" who attended alongside the researchers) from a range of countries (Argentina, Austria, Canada, Germany, Great Britain, Japan, Norway, Poland, Sweden, Switzerland, the US and the USSR). This marked the beginning of modern scientific collaboration on the subject. Conferences continue to take place every five years. During the Fourth conference in 1983, a special meeting between the "Big Four" participant countries (US, USSR, China, and Canada) officially created the International Permafrost Association.

In recent decades, permafrost research has attracted more attention than ever due to its role in climate change. Consequently, there has been a massive acceleration in published scientific literature. Around 1990, almost no papers containing the words "permafrost" and "carbon" were released: by 2020, around 400 such papers were published yearly.

== See also ==
- Permafrost Museum
