= List of species on Severnaya Zemlya =

This is a list of species recorded on Severnaya Zemlya. Severnaya Zemlya is a 37,000 km^{2} (14,000 sq mi) archipelago in the Russian high Arctic. It lies off Siberia's Taymyr Peninsula, separated from the mainland by the Vilkitsky Strait. This archipelago separates two marginal seas of the Arctic Ocean, the Kara Sea in the west and the Laptev Sea in the east.

== Flora ==
=== Vascular plants ===
Most common:

- Cerastium sp.
- Papaver polare
- Saxifraga caespitosa
- Saxifraga oppositifolia

Less common:

- Alopecurus alpinus
- Cerastium regelii
- Deschampsia sp.
- draba sp.
- Draba sp.
- Novosieversia glacialis
- Phippsia sp.
- Poa abbreviata
- Poa arctica
- Saxifraga cernua
- Saxifraga nivalis
- Salix polaris
- Stellaria sp.
- Minuartia sp.

=== Mosses ===
Most common:

- Detrichum flexicaule
- Dicranum sp.
- Pogonatum sp.
- Sanionia sp.
- Bryum sp.
- Orthothecium chryseum
- Tortura sp.

Less common:

- Andreaea sp.
- Aulacomnium turgidum
- Bryum cryophilum
- Calliergon giganteum
- Calliergon obtusifolium
- Calliergon sarmentosum
- Calliergon giganteum
- Campylophus sp.
- Dichodontium sp.
- Dicranoweisia sp.
- Dicranoweisia crispula
- Dirrichum sp.
- Ditrichum flexicaule
- Drepanocladus revolvens
- Drepanocladus exannulatus
- Hylocomium splendens
- Jungermannia sp.
- Loeskypnum badium
- Philonotis sp.
- Polytrichum sp.
- Ptilidium ciliare
- Racomitrium lanuginosum
- Sanionia uncinata
- Schistidium apocarpum
- Scorpidium turgescens
- Tomenthypnum nitens

=== Lichens ===
Most common:

- Cetraria nivalis
- Thamnolia vermicularis
- Cetraria sp.
- Cornicularia sp.
- Lecidea sp.
- Ochrolechia sp.
- Parmelia sp.

Less common:

- Alectoria sp.
- Buellia sp.
- Caloplaca sp.
- Cetaria cucullata
- Cetaria sp.
- Cladia sp.
- Cladonia sp.
- Dactylina arctica
- Dermatocarpon sp.
- Hypogymnia sp.
- Ochrolechia frigida
- Peltigera sp.
- Ramalina sp.
- Rhizocarpon sp.
- Sphaerophorus sp.
- Stereocaulon sp.
- Thamnolia vermicularis
- Thamnolia sp.
- Umbilicaria sp.
- Xanthoria elegans
- Xanthoria sp.

== Fauna ==
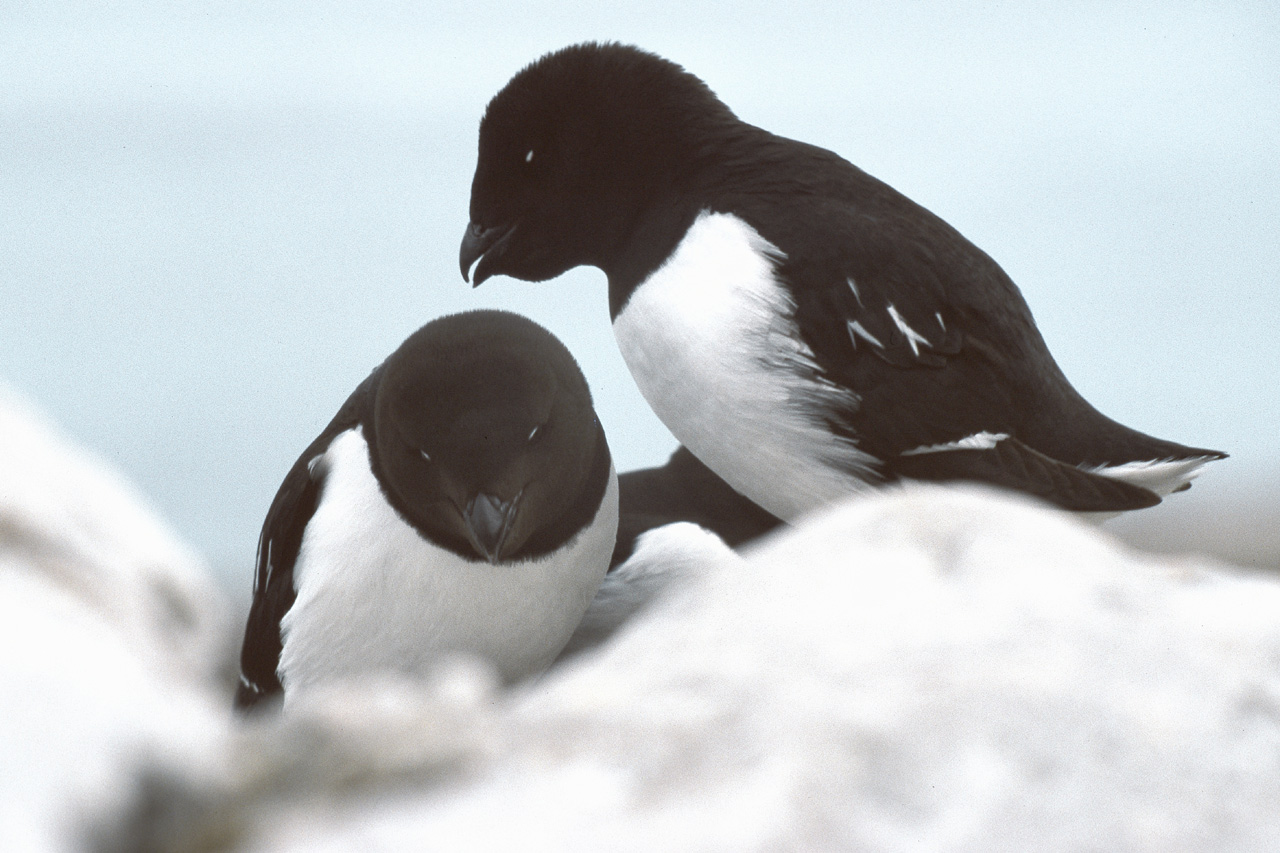
Severnaya Zemlya is the easternmost point in the breeding range of the little auk (Alle alle)

=== Breeding birds ===
- little auk (Alle alle)
- kittiwake (Rissa tridactyla)
- black guillemot (Cepphus grylle)
- ivory gull (Pagophila eburnea)
- glaucous gull (Larus hyperboreus)
- snow bunting (Plectrophenax nivalis)
- purple sandpiper (Calidris maritima)
- brent goose (Branta bernicla).
- Arctic tern (Sterna paradisaea)
- herring gull (Larus argentatus)
- red-throated diver (Gavia stellata)
- king eider (Somateria spectabilis)
- sanderling (Calidris alba)
- Arctic skua (Stercorarius parasiticus)
- long-tailed skua (Stercorarius longicaudus)
- snowy owl (Bubo scandiacus)

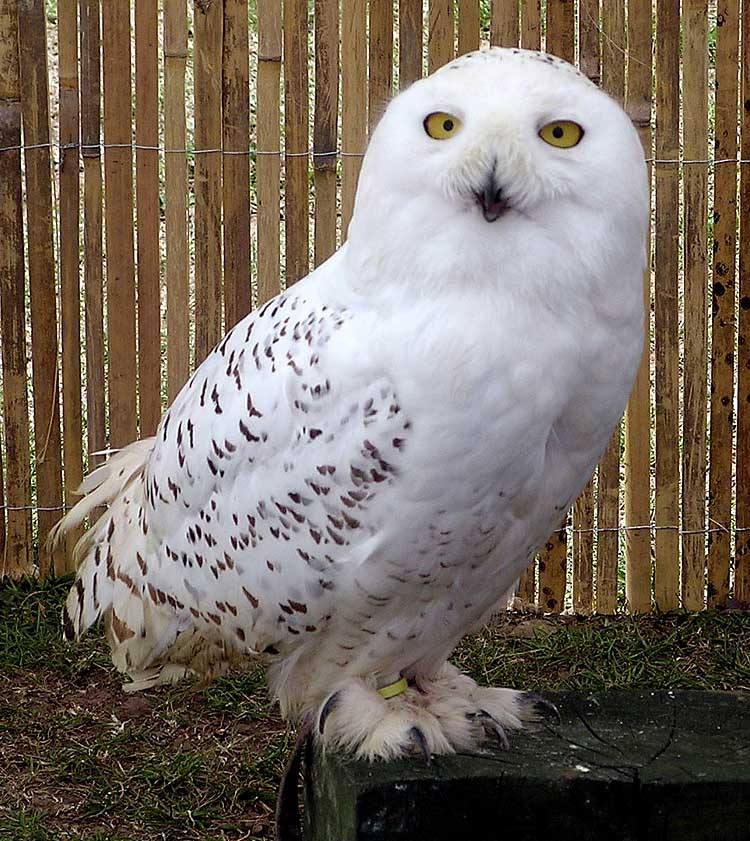
The snowy owl( Bubo scandiacus) is common across Severnaya Zemlya in years with high lemming populations.

- Lapland bunting (Calcarius lapponicus).
- pomarine skua (Stercorarius pomarinus)
- Ross's gull (Rhodostethia rosea)

=== Transient birds ===
- Brünnich's guillemot (Uria lomvia)
- rook (Corvus frugilegus)
- white wagtail (Motacilla alba)
- fulmar (Fulmarus glacialis)
- long-tailed duck (Clangula hyemalis)
- common eider (Somateria mollissima)
- peregrine falcon (Falco peregrinus)
- rock ptarmigan (Lagopus mutus)
- knot (Calidris canutus)
- sharp-tailed sandpiper (Calidris acuminata)
- red phalarope (Phalaropus fulicarius)
- great skua (Catharacta skua)
- Sabine's gull (Xema sabini)

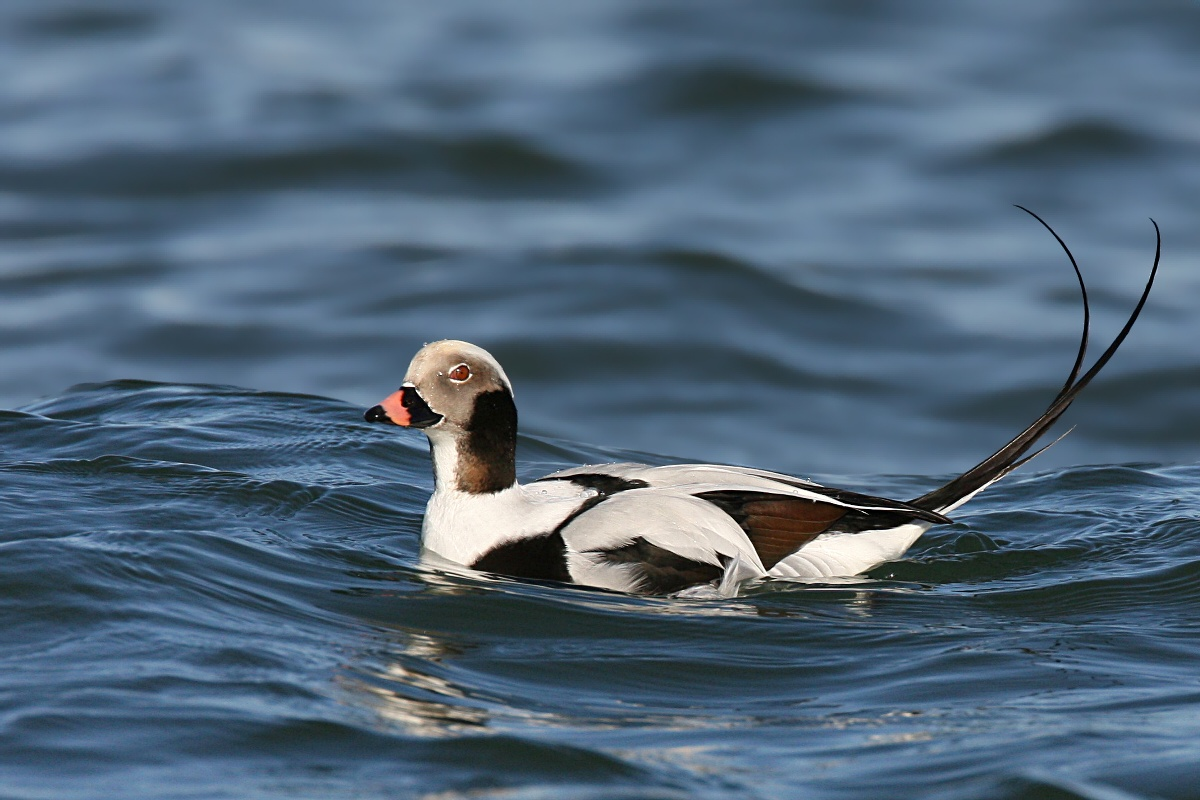
The long-tailed duck is speculated, but not confirmed, to breed on Severnaya Zemlya.

=== Mammals ===
- collared lemming (Dicrostonyx torquatus)
- Arctic fox (Alopex lagopus)
- wolf (Canis lupus)
- ermine (Mustela erminea)
- Arctic hare (Lepus timidus)
- reindeer (Rangifer tarandus)
- polar bear (Ursus maritimus)
