= Thamnolia taurica =

Scientific classification
- Kingdom: Fungi
- Division: Ascomycota
- Class: Lecanoromycetes
- Order: Pertusariales
- Family: Icmadophilaceae
- Genus: Thamnolia
- Species: T. taurica

Binomial name
- Thamnolia taurica (Wulfen) A.Massal. (1856)

Synonyms
- List: Lichen tauricus Wulfen (1789); Cladonia taurica (Wulfen) Hoffm. (1794); Baeomyces vermicularis var. tauricus (Wulfen) Ach. (1803); Cenomyce taurica (Wulfen) Röhl. (1813); Cenomyce vermicularis f. taurica (Wulfen) Ach. (1814); Pycnothelia taurica (Wulfen) Dufour (1821); Cladonia vermicularis var. taurica (Wulfen) Schaer. (1823); Cladonia vermicularis f. taurica (Wulfen) Flörke (1828); Cenomyce vermicularis var. taurica (Wulfen) Duby (1830); Cladonia subuliformis var. taurica (Wulfen) Tuck. (1839); Thamnolia vermicularis var. taurica (Wulfen) Schaer. (1850); Cladonia amaurocraea var. taurica (Wulfen) Körb. (1855); Cladonia amaurocraea f. taurica (Wulfen) Hepp (1857); Thamnolia vermicularis f. taurica (Wulfen) Arnold (1887); Cerania vermicularis var. taurica (Wulfen) A.L.Sm. (1918); Thamnolia vermicularis subsp. taurica (Wulfen) P.M.Jørg. (2019)

Species of lichen-forming fungus

Thamnolia taurica is a species of lichen in the family Icmadophilaceae. This alpine lichen forms pale, worm-like structures and occurs in high mountain habitats of the eastern Alps, Tatra Mountains, and western Carpathians. Molecular studies have shown it to be genetically distinct from other whiteworm lichens, having diverged from related lineages between 0.6 and 4.1 million years ago.

== Taxonomy ==
The lichen was first scientifically described in 1789 by Franz Xaver von Wulfen. Abramo Bartolommeo Massalongo reclassified it in Thamnolia in 1856.

Thamnolia taurica is one of the lineages within the "whiteworm" lichens that were long treated under a broad concept of Thamnolia vermicularis. In older treatments, taxa in this group were separated using a small set of thallus characters (such as hollow versus solid thalli, overall shape, and branching) alongside secondary chemistry. Two main chemotypes were often emphasized: one producing thamnolic (and decarboxythamnolic) acid and showing no reaction under ultraviolet light (UV–), and another producing squamatic and baeomycesic acids that fluoresce yellow (UV+ yellow). Because these traits do not consistently coincide, the taxonomy was disputed for decades; between 1850 and 2020, 67 names were published in Thamnolia, and the epithet taurica has been applied at several ranks (as a form, variety, subspecies, and species) in different classifications.

DNA-based work has reframed the complex by identifying three main lineages: a widespread lineage, a subarctic lineage, and an alpine lineage restricted to the Alps. The alpine lineage was at first treated as T. vermicularis in the strict sense, but later typification work applied the name T. taurica to it, with some authors preferring a subspecies treatment. In their synthesis, Robert Lücking and co-authors argue that the depth of genetic separation and the lack of evidence for gene flow between lineages best fits recognition at species rank, and they therefore accept T. taurica as the species corresponding to the alpine lineage; it appears to have diverged from the subarctic lineage roughly 0.6–4.1 million years ago, and both lineages split earlier from the widespread lineage. Although sexual reproduction has not been observed in living Thamnolia, molecular data show signals consistent with past recombination within lineages but not between them, supporting their interpretation as distinct species.

== Habitat and distribution ==
Thamnolia taurica occurs in high-alpine habitats and is known from the eastern Alps, the Tatra Mountains, and the western Carpathian Mountains. Although it has been recorded in Alaska, that record is thought to probably refer to T. vermicularis.
