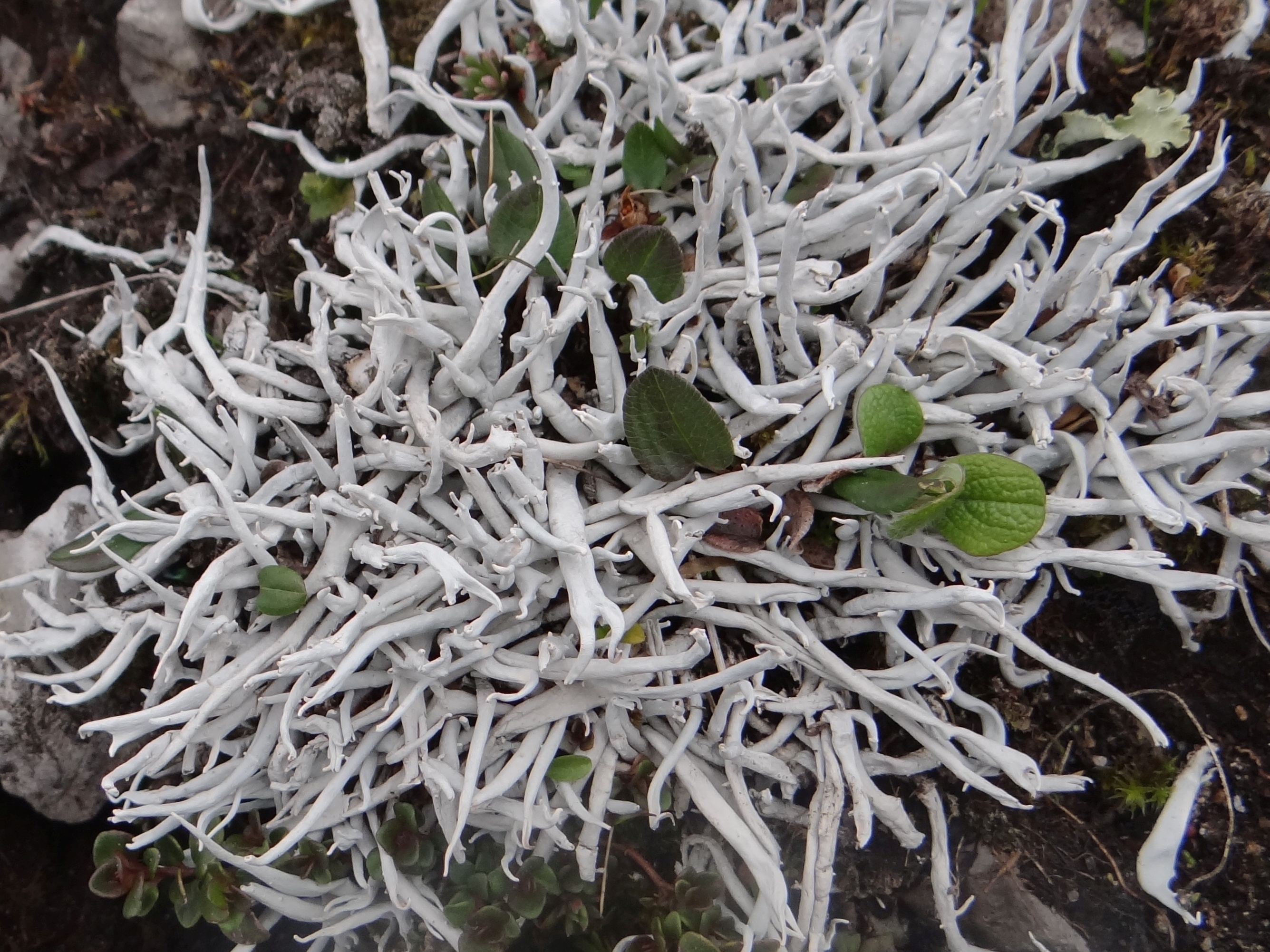
- In the West Tatra Mountains, Poland

Scientific classification
- Kingdom: Fungi
- Division: Ascomycota
- Class: Lecanoromycetes
- Order: Pertusariales
- Family: Icmadophilaceae
- Genus: Thamnolia
- Species: T. vermicularis

Binomial name
- Thamnolia vermicularis (Sw.) Schaer. (1850)

Synonyms
- List: Lichen vermicularis Sw. (1781); Stereocaulon vermiculare (Sw.) Raeusch. (1797); Baeomyces vermicularis (Sw.) Ach. (1803); Cladonia vermicularis (Sw.) DC. (1805); Cenomyce vermicularis (Sw.) Röhl. (1813); Cerania vermicularis (Sw.) Gray (1821); Pycnothelia vermicularis (Sw.) Dufour (1821); Patellaria fusca var. vermicularis (Sw.) Wallr. (1831); Cladonia uncialis var. vermicularis (Sw.) Link (1833); Cladonia amaurocraea var. vermicularis (Sw.) Flot. (1850); Cladonia gracilis var. vermicularis (Sw.) Mitt. (1851); Patellaria turbinata f. leucitica Wallr. (1831); Thamnolia subvermicularis Asahina (1937)

= Thamnolia vermicularis =

Species of lichen-forming fungus

Thamnolia vermicularis, the whiteworm lichen, is the traditional name applied to a widespread, morphologically uniform group of fruticose lichens in the family Icmadophilaceae. The species forms loose mats or scattered tufts of slender, worm-like, chalky-white branches that typically reach up to 5 cm long, growing on tundra terrain across arctic and alpine habitats. It was first described in 1781 by the Swedish botanist Olof Swartz from the alpine regions of Lapland, and the modern scientific name was formalized by Ludwig Schaerer in 1850.

Material traditionally identified as T. vermicularis occurs as two chemotypes distinguished by their chemical composition and ultraviolet fluorescence: one fluoresces yellow under UV light due to squamatic and baeomycesic acids, whereas the other produces thamnolic acid and does not fluoresce. Although these chemotypes were historically treated as separate species or subspecies, they are now generally interpreted as chemical variants, and recent DNA-based work has shown that material long identified as T. vermicularis includes additional, morphologically cryptic species, including T. tundrae in the far north and T. taurica in the European Alps. The UV-positive form is more common in the Northern Hemisphere, whereas the UV-negative form predominates in the Southern Hemisphere.

Thamnolia vermicularis is essentially sterile and reproduces asexually through thallus fragmentation and small spore-producing structures called pycnidia, lacking functional sexual fruiting bodies. Whiteworm lichens identified as T. vermicularis have an extremely broad distribution in cold regions, occurring in arctic and alpine tundra habitats on all continents except Africa and Antarctica, and shows considerable flexibility in its association with photosynthetic green algal partners from the genus Trebouxia. In traditional Chinese medicine, the species is used as a component of 'snow tea' (xuecha).

== Taxonomy ==
In 1781, the Swedish botanist Olof Swartz introduced the species as Lichen vermicularis from the alpine regions of Lapland, where he found it among grasses and mosses. He described a smooth, fruticose lichen forming prostrate, diffuse, worm-like branchlets; the branches were nearly cylindrical and hollow, awl-tipped and variably but rather sparsely branched, with scattered, globose lateral tubercles that he interpreted as fruiting bodies. Swartz compared it with Lichen subulatus but separated it by its milky colour, its diffuse, sprawling habit, and those rounded lateral tubercles. The epithet vermicularis reflects his remark that the plant recalls "ascarides" (intestinal worms). In North America, a common name used for the species is "whiteworm lichen".

In the decades after Swartz's description, the species was shifted among several early generic concepts. Authors transferred it in turn to Stereocaulon, Baeomyces, Cladonia and Cenomyce, and Samuel Frederick Gray even proposed the competing generic name Cerania for the same taxon. Others reduced it to varieties under allied Cladonia species (C. uncialis, C. amaurocraea and C. gracilis) or treated it as Patellaria fusca var. vermicularis.

=== Generic name and accepted combination ===
Maurice Choisy later emphasized that Thamnolia (as used from Ludwig Schaerer's 1850 treatment) corresponds to Gray's earlier genus Cerania (1821), and noted that several authors preferred Cerania, treating the two names as strictly synonymous. Schaerer's Thamnolia (1850) was published without awareness of Gray's earlier Cerania (1821), but Thamnolia was subsequently conserved over Cerania and remains the accepted name. The modern combination, Thamnolia vermicularis, was formalized by Schaerer in 1850 and has been the standard usage since.

=== Chemotypes and historical usage ===
Thamnolia vermicularis occurs in two chemically defined chemotypes. One produces squamatic and baeomycesic acids and fluoresces yellow under ultraviolet light (UV+), whereas the other produces thamnolic acid and does not fluoresce under UV light (UV−). These chemical variants are not morphologically distinguishable and may occur together, but they show a broad biogeographical trend: the UV+ (squamatic/baeomycesic) form is more frequent in the Northern Hemisphere, while the UV− (thamnolic) form is more common in the Southern Hemisphere.

The two forms have often been treated separately in the past, with the UV+ chemotype sometimes referred to as T. subuliformis (or as T. vermicularis subsp. subuliformis). Molecular studies have not supported treating the chemotypes as separate taxa, and they are generally treated as chemical variants rather than as taxonomic units. A comparative study using the traditional separation of T. vermicularis and T. subuliformis reported that the two can be distinguished by ultraviolet fluorescence, standard chemical spot tests, and thin-layer chromatography (TLC) of lichen products, with TLC providing the most detailed chemical separation.

=== Regional application of names in North America ===
In North America, the name Thamnolia vermicularis has historically been misapplied to material treated in earlier molecular work as T. subuliformis; under that interpretation, T. vermicularis sensu stricto was considered referable only to European material. Troy McMullin (2023) reported that North American material outside western Alaska is conspecific, and noted that some western Alaskan collections with baeomycesic and squamatic acids are now called T. tundrae. He also stated that T. tundrae cannot be separated from the baeomycesic and squamatic acid chemotype of T. subuliformis using morphology or chemistry, and requires DNA data for reliable identification.

=== Molecular lineages and species limits ===
Modern molecular work has suggested that material traditionally identified as Thamnolia vermicularis represents a complex of morphologically cryptic lineages. In 2018 Onuţ‐Brännström and colleagues, using internal transcribed spacer (ITS) data, additional nuclear markers, and type material, treated three well-supported lineages as separate species: T. vermicularis s. str., T. subuliformis s. str. (sensu stricto, in the strict sense), and the newly described T. tundrae. Under their interpretation, T. vermicularis s. str. has a uniform secondary chemistry (thamnolic acid) and a restricted distribution in the European Alps, the Tatra Mountains and the Western Carpathians, whereas T. subuliformis s. str. is widespread and includes two chemotypes. They concluded that secondary chemistry alone is not reliable for delimiting species in Thamnolia, but that chemistry together with geographical origin can be informative, and that ITS data can be used for species recognition.

=== Infraspecific treatments ===
In some regional treatments, the chemotypes are nevertheless distinguished at infraspecific rank. In Tasmania they can be sympatric but typically do not grow intermixed and show a degree of geographical separation, and they are maintained as varieties on that basis. In a Tasmanian treatment, the two forms are keyed by spot tests and chemistry: var. vermicularis contains thamnolic acid (K+ strong yellow; P+ orange; UV± dull orange), whereas var. subuliformis contains baeomycesic and squamatic acids (K± faint yellow; P+ yellow; UV+ yellow).

Yasuhiko Asahina (1937) also interpreted Thamnolia vermicularis in a broad sense as comprising two chemically distinct entities, and argued that the traditional division into f. subuliformis and f. taurica was blurred by intermediates and did not provide a clear boundary. He proposed retaining the name T. vermicularis for material that often discolours in storage and describing T. subvermicularis for the non-discolouring material, and on that basis described Thamnolia subvermicularis from part of the Hokkaido material then placed under T. vermicularis. He separated it by chemistry, reporting that the thallus is weakly K+ (yellow) and PD+ (yellow) and contains squamatic acid and baeomycesic acid, and by form, describing smooth, narrow, many-branched, cylindrical lobes with pointed tips (about 2–3.5 mm thick). It is now considered a synonym of T. vermicularis.

=== Reproductive structures and historical misinterpretations ===
The taxonomic history of Thamnolia vermicularis has also been shaped by uncertainty over its reproductive structures. Early descriptions included reports of both sexual and asexual structures, with lichenologists such as Abramo Bartolommeo Massalongo and Arthur Minks describing apothecia that later authors regarded as likely parasitic in origin. Reports of pycnidia appeared in the 19th century and early 20th century but were later overlooked in much of the English-language literature; modern work has confirmed pycnidial conidiomata with conidia on Thamnolia thalli, providing a plausible mechanism for long-distance dispersal. Reports of apothecia in Thamnolia refer to the parasite Thamnogalla crombiei, and the lichen itself has never been observed fertile.

=== Typification and recent interpretations ===
Onuţ‐Brännström and colleagues (2018) pointed out a mismatch between Swartz's "Lapponia" protologue and Culberson's neotypification, noting that T. vermicularis as typified by Culberson's neotype is not known from Lapland and that the neotype would nevertheless have to be followed until material from the original Lapland locality could be genetically analysed. To stabilize usage, Jørgensen (2019) designated a neotype from Stora Sjöfallet, Lule Lappmark, replacing Culberson's mixed and non-Lapland neotype (1963).

On molecular grounds, Jørgensen (2019) treated the lineage diversity as three subspecies: widespread subsp. vermicularis, alpine subsp. taurica (lectotypified from Jacquin 1789 and epitypified with a sequenced Austrian collection), and Arctic subsp. tundrae. He noted that these taxa are morphologically and chemically overlapping and cannot be separated without DNA data.

A later synthesis argued that the three main lineages recovered in multi-marker studies of Thamnolia are better treated as distinct species, rather than as infraspecific taxa. It noted that Onuţ-Brännström and colleagues applied the name T. subuliformis to the widespread lineage and T. vermicularis s. str. to the alpine lineage, but that Jørgensen later corrected typification so that the widespread lineage would carry the name T. vermicularis and the Alpine lineage the name T. taurica. On that basis, it recommended recognizing T. vermicularis for the widespread lineage (the taxon treated as T. subuliformis by Onuţ-Brännström et al.), together with T. tundrae for the subarctic lineage and T. taurica for the alpine lineage.

== Description ==
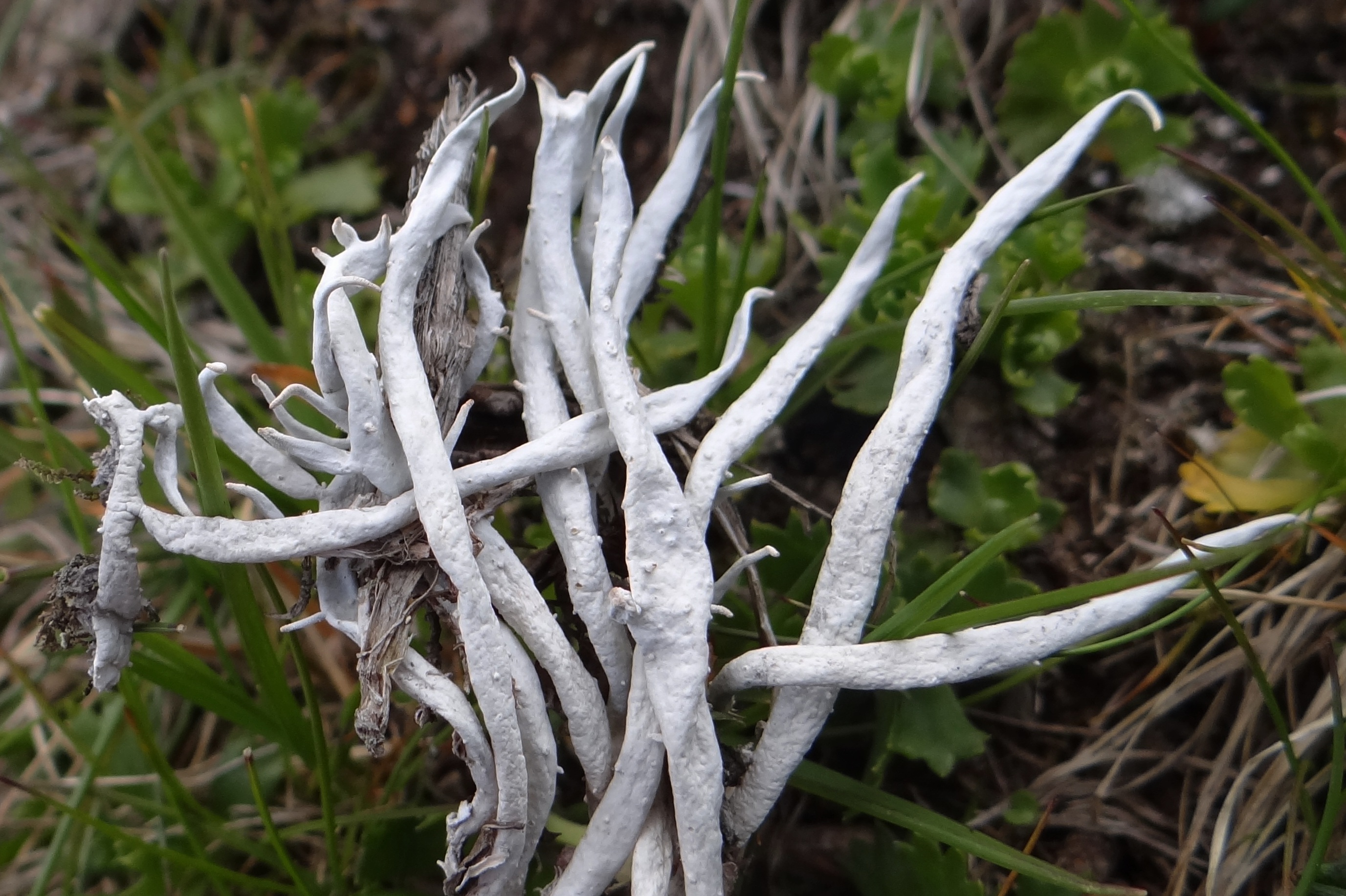
Loose tuft of chalky-white branches growing among grasses

The thallus of Thamnolia vermicularis forms loose mats or scattered tufts of slender, worm-like branches that typically reach about 5 cm long and 1–2 mm in diameter. In one treatment the branches are reported to reach about 10 cm in length and about 2 mm in width. The branches usually lie decumbent or straggling across the substrate and less frequently stand more or less erect. Short lateral side branches are uncommon, although the thallus may become rather densely tufted in some patches. The branches are smooth, cylindrical and often hollow with thin walls, and have tapered tips; they are a conspicuous chalky white throughout. Vegetative propagules such as soredia and isidia are absent.

Asexual reproductive structures are produced as small pustule-like swellings on the branch surface. These conidiomata are roughly hemispherical, about 200–350 micrometres (μm) across and 150–200 μm high, with an irregular, pore-bearing surface that exudes pinkish droplets made up of a mucilaginous mass of conidia. Inside, the conidiophores are elongate and arranged in chains of conidiogenous cells, each with small peg-like outgrowths near the upper cell septum where new conidia are formed. The conidia themselves are tiny, rod-shaped spores, 3–5 × 1–2 μm, slightly narrowed at one end, colourless, thin-walled and without internal septa.

== Chemistry ==
In a macrochemical study, Asahina (1937) reported two consistent reaction patterns in Thamnolia material then treated as T. vermicularis. Some specimens gradually developed a dull rosy tint in storage and showed a strong reaction with potassium hydroxide (K) that darkened on drying, whereas other specimens remained white and reacted only weakly. He attributed this colour-reaction behaviour to baeomycesic acid and noted that squamatic acid does not produce those colour reactions in the standard reagents he used.

Reported secondary metabolites from Thamnolia vermicularis include vermicularin, everninic acid, squamatic acid, barbatinic acid, arabitol, mannitol, and baeomycesic acid. A 2025 review of Ostropomycetidae lichen chemistry summarised T. vermicularis as a source mainly of phenolic secondary metabolites, including several depside derivatives, and recorded thamnolic acid A, reported from chloroform extracts together with β-resorcylic acid and everninic acid, as well as hypothamnolic acid, vermicularin, thamnoliadepsides A–E, barbatinic acid, atranorin, and 3-O-methyllecanorate; it also noted minor aromatic compounds including several methylbenzoic acids and a related acetophenone. Reverse-phase high-performance liquid chromatography and chromatography analyses of Colombian Andean material detected multiple carotenoid pigments in T. vermicularis thalli, with total carotenoid content reported as high as 45.78 μg/g (dry mass) in one specimen.

Laboratory tests have reported antioxidant activity, suggested to be linked to the depside thamnolic acid. The 2025 review summarised additional screening results, including reported antibacterial activity for thamnolic acid A, reported anti-inflammatory activity for thamnoliadepsides and barbatinic acid, and protein-aggregation assays (using hen egg-white lysozyme as a model system) in which several constituents – including some methylbenzoic acids and vermicularin – were tested. An ethanol-derived extract of Thamnolia vermicularis has been studied in a transgenic mouse model of Alzheimer's disease, with reported effects on learning performance and brain markers.

== Traditional use ==
Thamnolia vermicularis has a long-standing use in traditional Chinese medicine as a "snow tea" (xuecha) in traditional practice and has been described as anti-inflammatory. In Yunnan, market material sold as xuecha may be a mixture of T. vermicularis and T. subuliformis, which are morphologically indistinguishable.

Some sources give its Chinese name as Baixuecha ("white snow tea"). A 2017 food-science study described T. vermicularis as an edible lichen in East Asia that is consumed as a tea and is commonly called "white snow tea" in China; it also noted that reported medicinal uses are not supported by scientific evidence. In China, material sold as "snow tea" (also called "Taibai tea") is treated in folk use as a mixture of two Thamnolia species. In 2015, Yang and colleagues reported that minority communities in north-west Yunnan have long consumed Thamnolia lichens as a tea drink, but that increased collecting associated with tourism and local economic development has heavily reduced wild resources; noting that lichens grow very slowly and that protection measures were lacking, they called for conservation to support sustainable use.

In the Nepal Himalaya, Thamnolia vermicularis has been recorded mainly for ritual and spiritual purposes rather than as a food lichen. Devkota and colleagues reported that some households keep a handful of the lichen above the main entrance in the belief that it wards off evil spirits and helps maintain peace at home and among family members. In the same study, Sherpa and Lama communities used T. vermicularis (together with Usnea longissima) as an ingredient in incense powder, mixed with aromatic plant material and burned during prayers and religious ceremonies. The authors also recorded the Nepali vernacular name Dankini Jhyauu ('witch mushroom'), reflecting that respondents sometimes regarded the species as a mushroom rather than a lichen.

== Photobiont ==
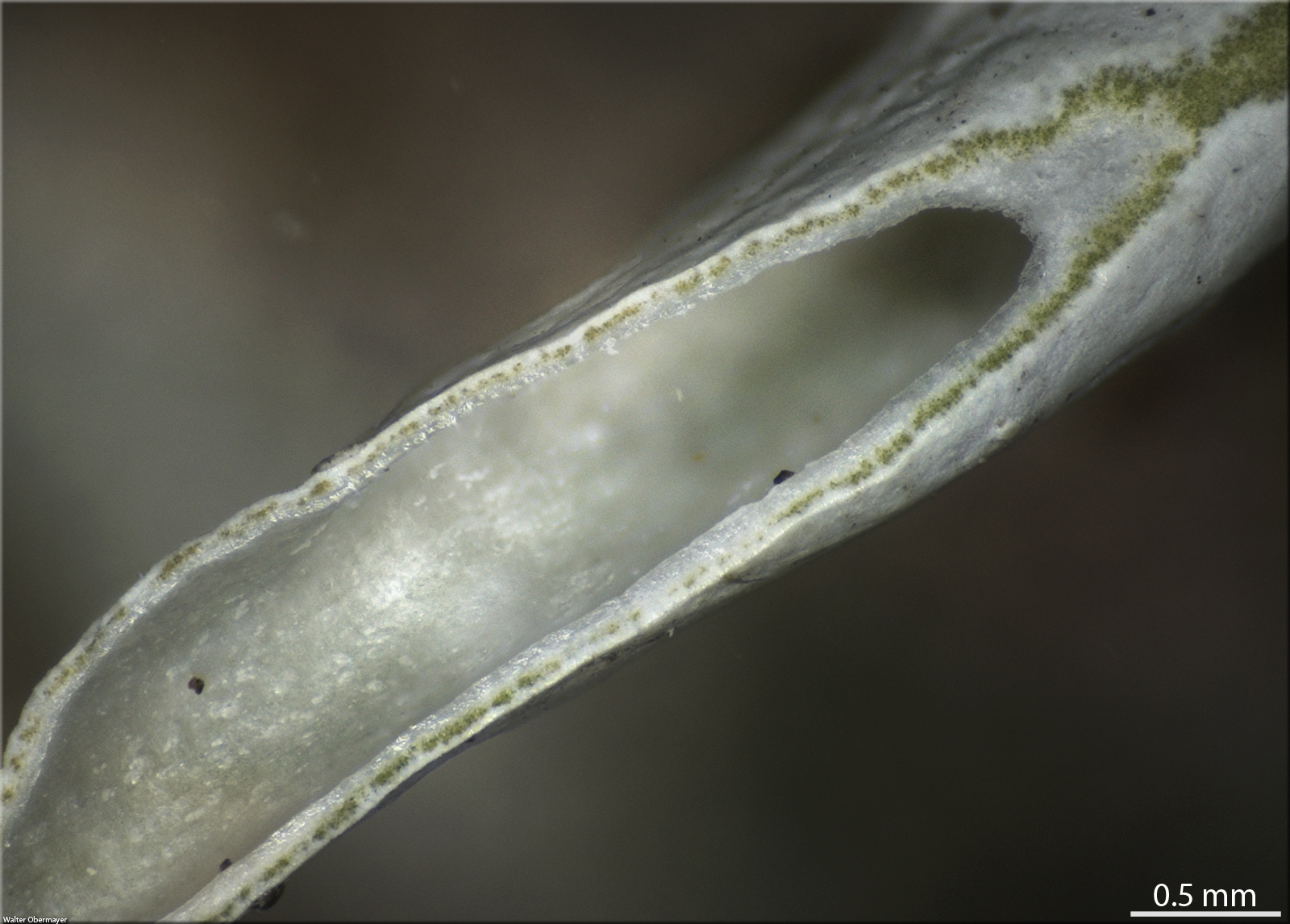
Angled longitudinal cut through a branch, showing the hollow interior and the green algal layer near the surface (scale bar 0.5 mm)

Like most lichens, Thamnolia vermicularis is a symbiosis between a fungus and a photosynthetic alga. Molecular studies show that its photobionts belong to the green-algal genus Trebouxia, and that the species can associate with more than one algal lineage rather than a single, fixed partner. In a global phylogeographic study, some Thamnolia populations were found to harbour only Trebouxia simplex as the photobiont, whereas others, especially within the widespread lineage, partnered with several Trebouxia clades, indicating relatively low photobiont specificity.

Because T. vermicularis commonly disperses by thallus fragmentation, its fungal and algal partners might be expected to co-disperse and remain fairly constant. However, analyses of internal transcribed spacer (ITS) rDNA sequences have recovered a diverse set of Trebouxia photobionts from T. vermicularis; one survey found 14 algal ITS sequence types spanning several major Trebouxia clades, and statistical tests rejected the idea that Thamnolia-associated algae form a single lineage. In the same study, fungal and algal phylogenies showed limited agreement; photobiont composition was structured mainly by ecogeographic region (boreal/Arctic, east Asian, tropical montane) rather than fungal genotype.

== Habitat and distribution ==
Thamnolia vermicularis has an extremely broad geographic range in cold regions. It is found in arctic and alpine tundra habitats on all continents except Africa and Antarctica. In the Northern Hemisphere it is circumpolar, and in the Southern Hemisphere it occurs in disjunct high-elevation locales including New Guinea, New Zealand, Australia, and the Andes of South America. This lichen grows on many types of tundra terrain – from bare open gravel and frost-heaved soil ("frost boils") to rich, moist mossy thickets among dwarf willows and heaths. It is mostly an alpine and Arctic species, but it can also be found at low elevations in extreme northern coastal areas where conditions are windswept and exposed. In Nepal, it has been reported to occur at elevations ranging from 3,869 to 5,455 m in a compilation of published records; this reported range extends above the tree line used in the study. In China, T. vermicularis has been reported from high-elevation and high-latitude cold regions, with records concentrated in the south-western Hengduan Mountains and extending to provinces including Yunnan, Sichuan, Tibet, Shaanxi, Xinjiang, Inner Mongolia, Jilin and Heilongjiang, at 1,350–5,200 m. In the Venezuelan Andes, it has been reported as widespread above about 3,500 m, and was collected and examined in quantity in the páramo of the Pico Piedras Blancas from sites above 4,200 m.

== Ecology ==
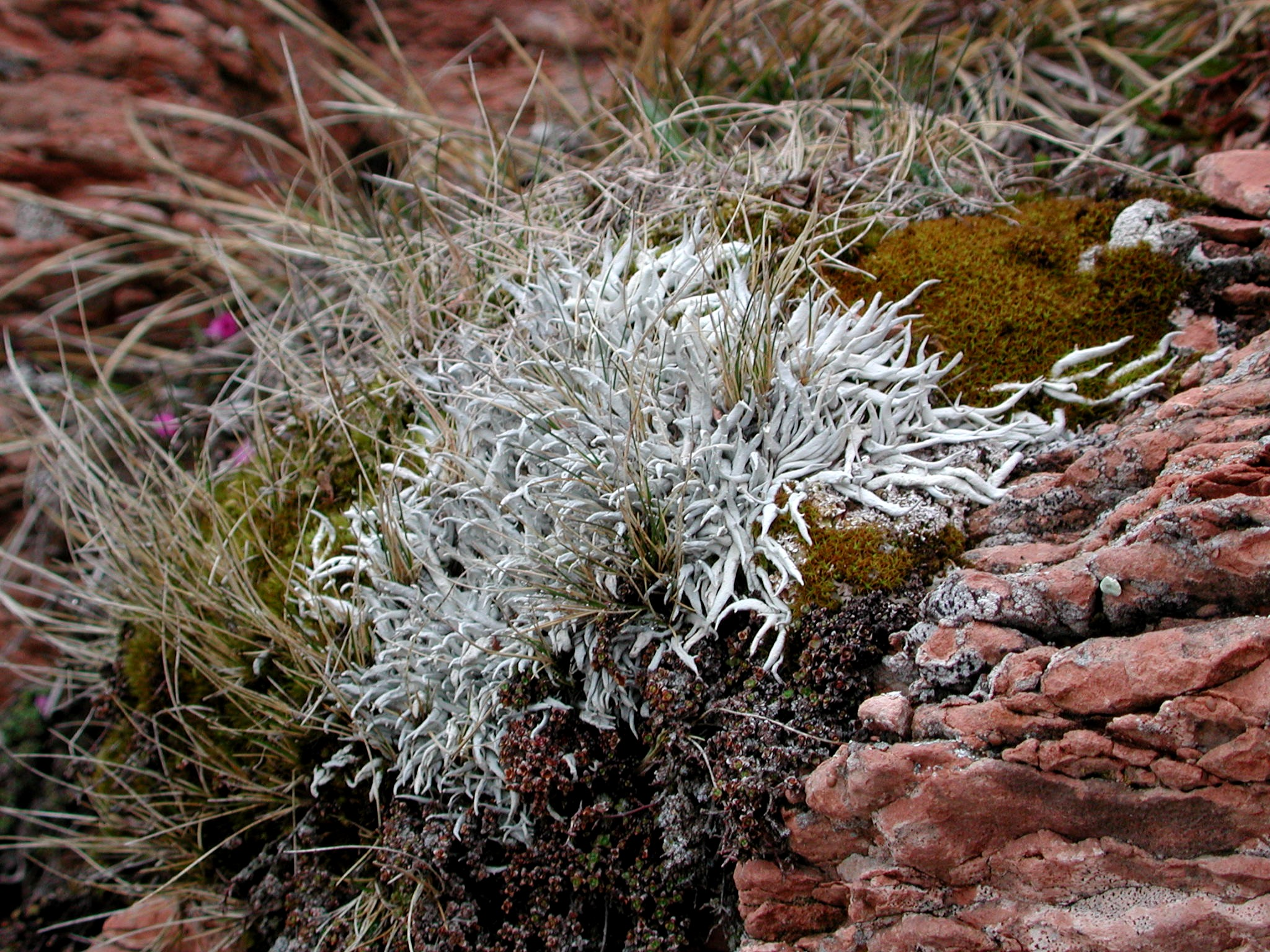
Tufts of Thamnolia vermicularis growing among alpine grasses on Monte Bondone, northern Italy (2014)

Thamnolia vermicularis is essentially sterile, lacking a functional sexual stage. No true apothecia (sexual fruiting bodies) are produced; early reports of apothecia on this lichen were likely misidentifications of parasitic fungi. Instead it reproduces and spreads solely by asexual means. The most common mode of propagation is thallus fragmentation: its white, worm-like branches (upright thalli) break into lateral branches or longitudinal strips, each fragment containing both the fungal partner (mycobiont) and the photosynthetic algal partner. The fragments detach as longitudinal strips along pre-formed separation zones, with the strips forming from the medulla outward toward the cortex; the strips stay temporarily attached via internal hyphae before breaking free. In addition, Thamnolia produces pycnidia on the thallus surface that bear conidiospores (mitospores). The release of large quantities of these minute conidia is believed to facilitate long-distance dispersal, which could help explain the lichen's cosmopolitan distribution and the low genetic variation observed between populations.

An experimental trampling study in the Belianske Tatras (Slovakia) recorded T. vermicularis in native alpine plant communities, but found that its response to trampling was context-dependent and generally weak: it was more resistant under heavier trampling in one community but more resistant under lighter trampling in another, and after regeneration it was recorded only in a single trampled plot where its seasonal resistance remained low. The authors also reported that some mosses and lichens disappeared as a delayed response to trampling, and T. vermicularis was absent from several regenerated, previously trampled communities in 2022.

A long-term reciprocal turf-transplant experiment in the alpine zone of the Rock and Pillar Range (South Island, New Zealand) tracked T. vermicularis for 14 years across sites that differ strongly in the depth and duration of snow cover. The lichen rapidly colonized turves moved to the exposed summit plateau (where it is naturally common), but declined quickly when turves were transplanted into snowbeds and was almost absent there after several years. The authors suggested that this rapid, directional response to altered snow cover makes T. vermicularis a useful bioindicator of changing alpine snow regimes.

In a shorebird nesting study in the arctic tundra of the western Taymyr Peninsula (Siberia), ruddy turnstones and Pacific golden plovers preferred to line their nests with the lichen Thamnolia vermicularis, supplemented with other lichens, willow leaves, and a small fraction of moss. The authors suggested that using local materials can improve nest crypsis, and noted that Thamnolia provides better camouflage in these breeding habitats than some more strongly insulating materials. Derek Ratcliffe reported that lichen is a frequent lining material in golden plover nests, being recorded in 175 of 273 British nests where lining was described (and forming the sole lining in 34); "reindeer moss" Cladonia lichens can form a thick pad beneath the eggs, and their tubular thalli were suggested to provide good insulation. He also cited Sauer's work on the Pacific (Asiatic) golden plover on St Lawrence Island, where T vermicularis was reported as the preferred nest-lining material, and noted that many golden plovers add lining material as incubation proceeds.

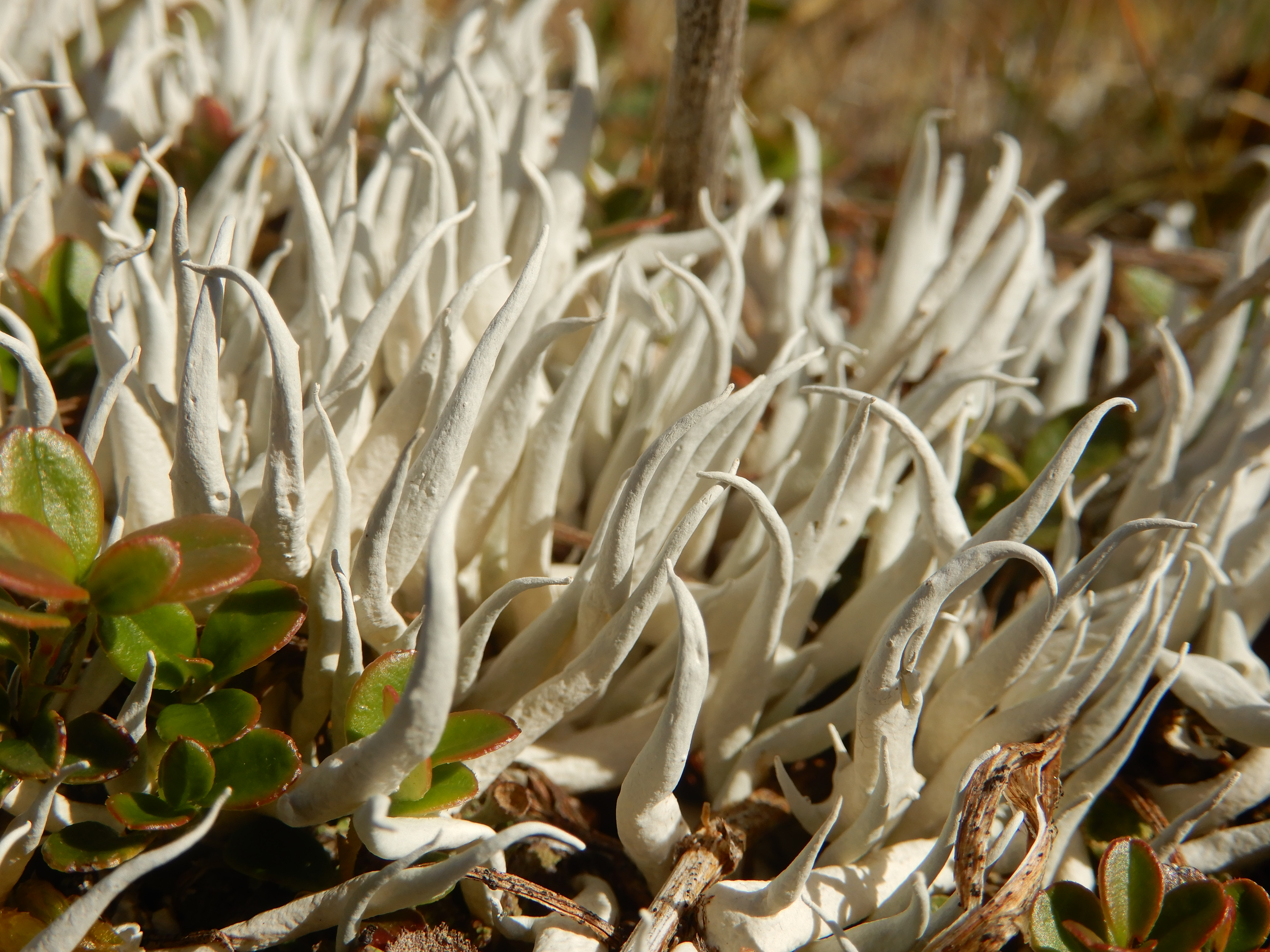
Ground-level view of the whiteworm lichen in the Altai Mountains, Kazakhstan

Over geological timescales, the distribution of Thamnolia is thought to reflect ancient dispersal events; it has even been noted that this lichen is absent from recently formed volcanic terrain, suggesting that it colonized its present sites long ago and does not readily establish on new substrates in modern times.

In polar-desert environments, Thamnolia vermicularis is shaped strongly by substrate and moisture regime. In a survey of 157 sample plots at Cape Zhelaniya (northern Novaya Zemlya), lichen cover and species richness generally declined with increasing elevation, and lichen cover also decreased as bryophyte cover increased. By contrast, both richness and cover increased on better-drained, coarse-textured surfaces, measured as a higher proportion of soil particles larger than 0.125 mm. The authors recorded 84 lichen species in total and treated Thamnolia vermicularis s. l. as the single most "active" species in the area (present across all habitat types recognized), although it usually occurred as scattered thalli rather than forming high cover.

Vegetation surveys in arctic–alpine tundra have treated Thamnolia vermicularis as the character species of a small-scale terricolous lichen community known as the Thamnolietum vermicularis, recorded from both Greenland and the Austrian Alps and occurring mainly in wind-exposed dwarf-shrub and dwarf shrub–graminoid vegetation. In that study of 69 vegetation plots, the authors distinguished eight floristic groups and separated two subassociations linked largely to substrate conditions: an acidic typicum and a calcareous vulpicidetosum tubulosi, reflecting a strong pH gradient and differences in soil stability. They interpreted the Thamnolietum as an indicator of strong wind exposure and described a pronounced vertical layering within stands, with the uppermost layer fully exposed while the lower layers are more sheltered and can retain moisture. This layering allows many species typical of less extreme conditions to persist in protected gaps and helps explain the high small-scale diversity recorded in these lichen-rich patches.

In the high Venezuelan Andes (Páramo de Piedras Blancas), thalli were reported to occur as loose, vagrant strands on needle-ice soils and even on the domed surfaces of cushion plants; Pérez inferred that local dispersal and redistribution are driven mainly by wind, with thalli also accumulating in hollows and depressions.

Physiological measurements in upland tundra in Alaska suggested that carbon gain in Thamnolia vermicularis is tightly constrained by light, hydration and temperature. The lichen required moderate light to reach net carbon gain, and net photosynthesis declined when thalli were very wet; the authors noted that this high-moisture depression could be prevented at elevated CO_{2} and was also apparent in field observations. They also found that T. vermicularis can remain photosynthetically active at low temperatures, with measurable net photosynthesis even at the freezing point, and suggested that photoinhibitory after-effects may help explain why field rates were sometimes lower than laboratory measurements would predict.

=== Species interactions ===
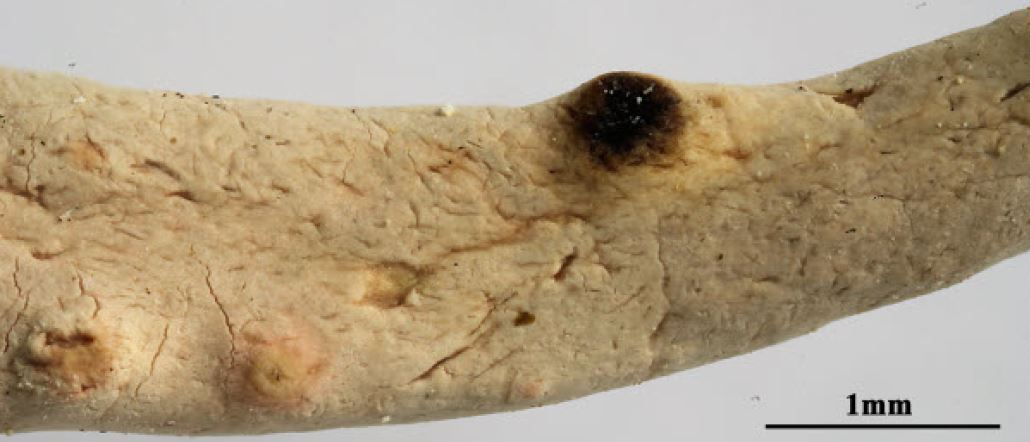
Closeup of a branch showing a gall caused by a lichenicolous fungus

Thamnolia vermicularis also hosts a specialized community of lichenicolous fungi (fungi that live on lichens) often as parasites, which can cause galls or localized discolouration on the lichen's branches. Based on 740 Alpine collections, Zimmermann and Berger recorded 23 lichenicolous species on Thamnolia in the European Alps, matching the number known from Arctic Thamnolia; across both regions 31 taxa have been reported, with more than half shared between the two biomes, and most species are specialized on Thamnolia rather than being generalist lichen parasites. Infection is often patchy (frequently restricted to individual branches and, in some species, concentrated on older, partly hidden basal parts), so dense cushions may show little external change. In the Alps the commonest associate reported was Sphaerellothecium thamnoliae, detected in about 15% of specimens as a fine, usually sterile hyphal network, followed in frequency by the gall-forming parasite Thamnogalla crombiei and the ascomycetes Polycoccum alpinum and Stigmidium frigidum. The authors suggested that lichenicolous fungi are favoured in long-established stands and in microhabitats that remain damp for longer—such as shaded blockfields where snow melts late, wind- and sun-sheltered sites, and moist snow-bed hollows—whereas young glacier forefields lacked parasitized thalli.

Zhurbenko reviewed the lichenicolous fungi recorded from Thamnolia vermicularis and reported 23 species in 18 genera known worldwide from this host, with most of them recorded only from Thamnolia; he also ranked T. vermicularis 15th worldwide among lichens for the richness of its lichenicolous mycobiota. In the Holarctic, the commonest associates on T. vermicularis were Thamnogalla crombiei (21% of 190 specimens examined), Polycoccum vermicularium (15%), Sphaerellothecium thamnoliae var. thamnoliae (12%), Stigmidium frigidum (11%), Cercidospora thamnoliae (9%), and Odontotrema santessonii (5%). Some infections form visible swellings: Cercidospora thamnogalloides induces gall-like swellings that may be concolorous or pale brownish vinaceous, and host branches can become contorted under infection.
