= C. nivalis =

C. nivalis may refer to:

- Caladenia nivalis, an orchid species in the genus Caladenia
- Cardiocondyla nivalis, an ant species in the genus Cardiocondyla
- Cetraria nivalis, a lichen species found on Severnaya Zemlya
- Chionomys nivalis, a rodent species
- Chlamydomonas nivalis, a green alga species
- Cotoneaster nivalis, a woody plant species
- Cryphoeca nivalis, a spider species
