= Thamnolia tundrae =

Scientific classification
- Kingdom: Fungi
- Division: Ascomycota
- Class: Lecanoromycetes
- Order: Pertusariales
- Family: Icmadophilaceae
- Genus: Thamnolia
- Species: T. tundrae

Binomial name
- Thamnolia tundrae Brännström & Tibell (2018)
- Holotype: Täljstensvalen mountain (Jämtland, Sweden)

Species of lichen

Thamnolia tundrae is a species of lichen in the family Icmadophilaceae. Its distribution covers the arctic tundra of Eurasia and extends to the North American Aleutian Islands. Its thallus features white, hollow, cylindrical tufts, which are morphologically the same as the other members of genus Thamnolia. Thamnolia tundrae, however, is phylogenetically distinct from these other similar species. Secondary compounds found in the lichen include baeomycesic acid and squamatic acid. The species is suspected to have survived the latest glaciation in coastal refugia in regions close to its current range.

== Taxonomy ==
Thamnolia tundrae was described as a new species in 2018 by Ioana Onut-Brännström and Leif Tibell after multilocus phylogenetic analyses showed that the genus Thamnolia contains three genetically distinct but outwardly very similar lineages. The new taxon corresponds to "Lineage A" of earlier studies, a clade that differs from others in its genus chiefly in DNA sequences and chemistry. The holotype was collected on Täljstensvalen mountain (Jämtland, Sweden) and is preserved in the UPS herbarium (specimen L-812491). Although morphologically indistinguishable from T. subuliformis and T. vermicularis, T. tundrae forms a well-supported clade in analyses of up to six nuclear markers and is fixed for a UV-positive chemical profile, supporting its recognition as a separate species.

In a 2019 reassessment of the "troublesome genus" Thamnolia, Per Magnus Jørgensen proposed that the three lineages delimited by multilocus phylogenies—T. vermicularis, T. subuliformis and T. tundrae—should be treated as subspecies of a broadly circumscribed T. vermicularis. He argued that because the lineages are morphologically indistinguishable yet occupy largely allopatric ranges, their differentiation fits the traditional concept of infraspecific geographic races rather than full species status. Accordingly, Jørgensen recognised T. vermicularis subsp. vermicularis (widespread), subsp. taurica (eastern Alps) and subsp. tundrae (Arctic), and he published the new combination Thamnolia vermicularis subsp. tundrae. Despite this proposed reduction in rank, the change has not been universally adopted. Index Fungorum still lists Thamnolia tundrae as the current, accepted species-level name, indicating continued support for its recognition as a distinct species as of July 2025.

== Description ==
The lichen forms chalk-white, hollow cylinders (podetia) that can be unbranched or weakly branched, standing erect or lying prostrate in mats. Each cylinder grows a few millimetres to several centimetres long and is essentially smooth, although tufts may develop where branches arise. Because the species reproduces mainly by fragmenting, no sexual fruiting bodies (apothecia) have been observed. The thallus is a skinny, worm-like tube of fungal tissue densely packed with microscopic green algae (the photobiont), giving it a tough, stringy feel.

Spot tests are diagnostic: a dab of potassium hydroxide solution (K) or para-phenylenediamine (PD) turns the cortex yellow, and the thallus fluoresces brilliant white under long-wave ultraviolet light. These reactions reflect the presence of the secondary metabolites (lichen products) baeomycesic and squamatic acids. Molecular studies show that the photobiont belongs to Trebouxia simplex (clades 1 and 2). Taken together, colourless cylinders, fixed UV-positive chemistry and a specific algal partner distinguish T. tundrae when DNA data are considered.

== Habitat and distribution ==
Thamnolia tundrae is restricted to the Arctic tundra of the Northern Hemisphere. Verified collections are known from northern Sweden and Norway, across the Siberian Arctic of Russia, and eastward to the Aleutian Islands of Alaska. It has not been recorded south of the tree line, and within its range it often grows beside (but genetically separate from) the circumpolar T. subuliformis while remaining allopatric with the alpine-montane T. vermicularis.

Field observations indicate a preference for open, wind-swept tundra soils and gravel where snow cover is thin and competition from vascular plants is low. Population genetic evidence suggests the species may have survived the Last Glacial Maximum in coastal refugia near its present range before expanding onto newly deglaciated ground.
