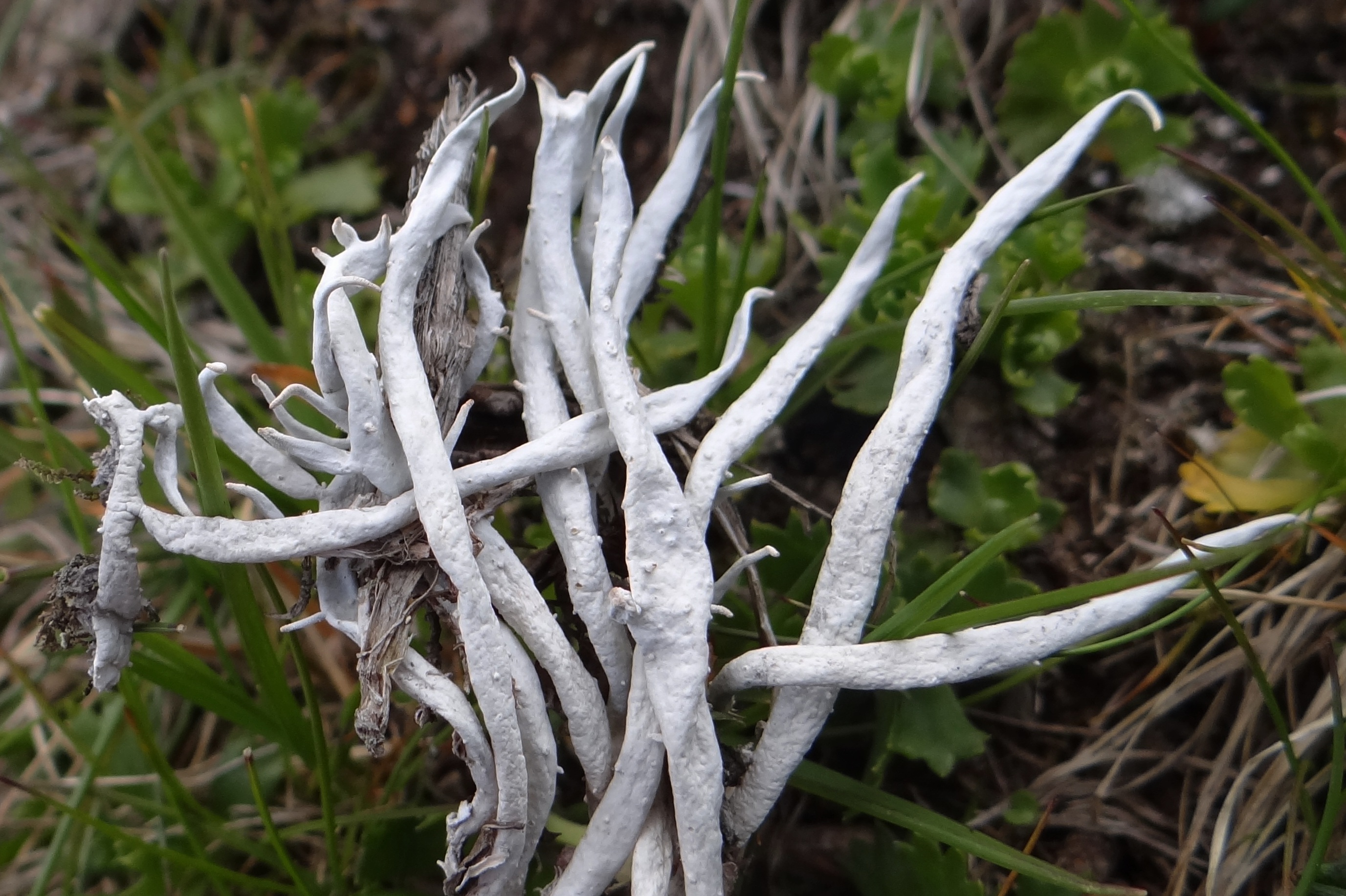
- Thamnolia vermicularis

Scientific classification
- Kingdom: Fungi
- Division: Ascomycota
- Class: Lecanoromycetes
- Order: Pertusariales
- Family: Icmadophilaceae
- Genus: Thamnolia; Ach. ex Schaer. (1850)

Type species
- Thamnolia vermicularis (Sw.) Schaer. (1850)

Species
- T. juncea T. papelillo T. subuliformis T. taurica T. tundrae T. vermicularis

Synonyms
- Cerania Gray (1821)

= Thamnolia =

Genus of lichen

Thamnolia is a genus of lichens in the family Icmadophilaceae. Members of the genus are commonly called whiteworm lichens.

Two species of Thamnolia are used by ethnic peoples of Yunnan Province (China) as a component of purported health-promoting tea: Thamnolia vermicularis, and T. subuliformis.

== Taxonomy ==
Thamnolia has a long history of unsettled circumscription. A review of the genus reports that 67 names were published in Thamnolia between 1850 and 2020, but 22 of these names actually apply to unrelated genera; many of the remaining names were proposed at infraspecific rank rather than as separate species.

Taxa in Thamnolia were traditionally separated using a small set of visible characters, especially whether the thallus is hollow or solid, overall branching pattern, and secondary chemistry. Two main chemical profiles were emphasized: thalli producing thamnolic (and decarboxythamnolic) acid do not fluoresce under ultraviolet light (UV−), whereas thalli producing squamatic and baeomycesic acids fluoresce yellow (UV+ yellow). Because these chemical and morphological traits do not reliably correlate, authors have alternated between treating the genus as a single variable species and recognizing multiple taxa defined mainly by either morphology or chemistry (or both).

More recent multi-marker phylogenetic work is summarised as supporting three principal lineages: one widespread, one subarctic, and one restricted to the Alps. The widespread lineage in particular shows little consistent correspondence with the traditional morphological and chemical characters, and the review argues that the best treatment is to recognise the three lineages as separate species: Thamnolia vermicularis for the widespread lineage (including material previously treated as T. subuliformis), T. tundrae for the subarctic lineage, and T. taurica for the Alpine lineage. Although sexual reproduction in Thamnolia is not known, the review points to molecular signals of past recombination within (but not between) these lineages, and to their overlapping ranges, as evidence that they represent reproductively isolated entities.

== Species ==
In the three-species classification proposed by Lücking et al., T. subuliformis, T. juncea and T. papelillo are treated as synonyms of T. vermicularis.

- Thamnolia juncea R.Sant. (2004)
- Thamnolia papelillo R.Sant. (2004)
- Thamnolia subuliformis (Ehrh.) W.L.Culb. (1963)
- Thamnolia taurica (Wulfen) A.Massal. (1856)
- Thamnolia tundrae Brännström & Tibell (2018)
- Thamnolia vermicularis (Sw.) Schaer. (1850)
