= Sierra de la Culata =

Mountain range in Venezuela

Sierra de La Culata
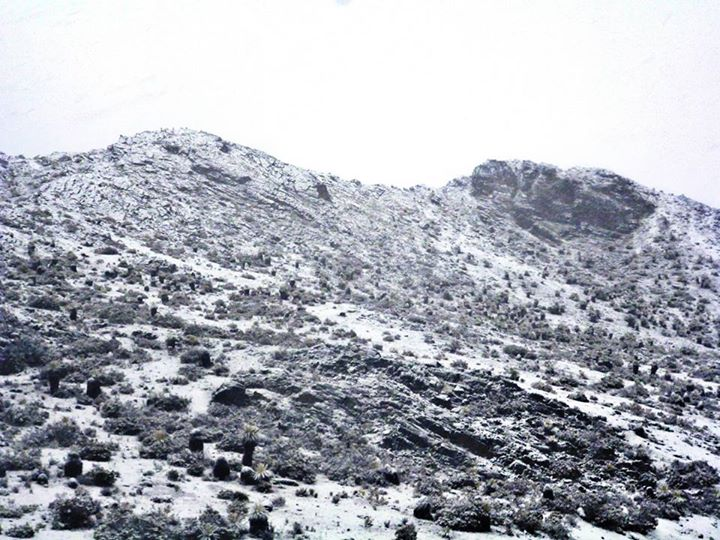
- Sierra de La Culata on snowy season

Highest point
- Peak: Pico Piedras Blancas
- Elevation: 4,737 m (15,541 ft)
- Coordinates: 8°59′13″N 71°15′0″W

Geography
- Location within Venezuela
- Country: Venezuela
- Region(s): Mérida, Trujillo

The Sierra de La Culata is a mountain range in the largest massif in Venezuela, the Cordillera de Mérida, which in turn is part of the northern extent of the Cordillera de los Andes (Andes Mountains). The Sierra la Culata includes some of the highest peaks in Venezuela, such as Pico Piedras Blancas, Pico Pan de Azúcar, and Collado del Cóndor.

It is located between the states of Mérida and Trujillo. Most of the lagoons are a result of the Mérida glaciation.

The Sierra La Culata National Park is a protected area within the range.

== Gallery ==
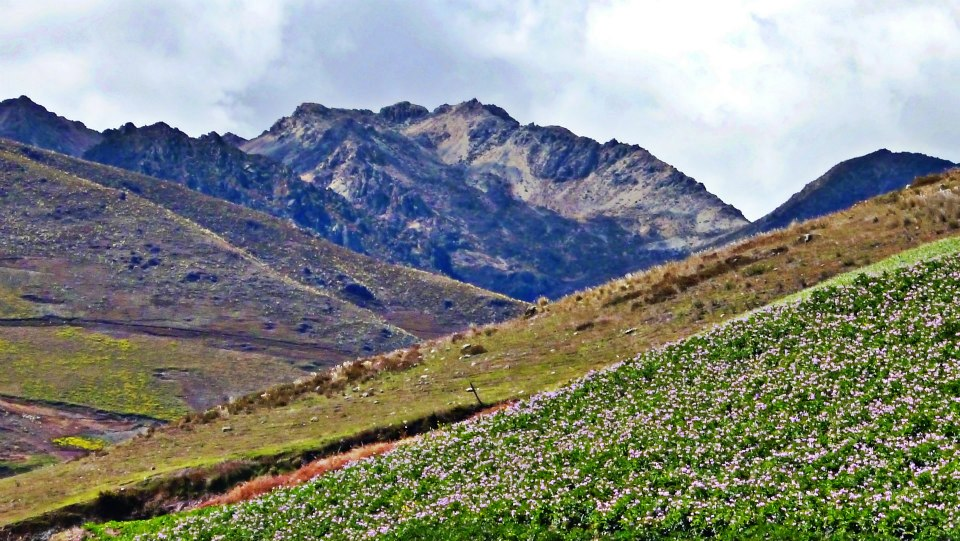

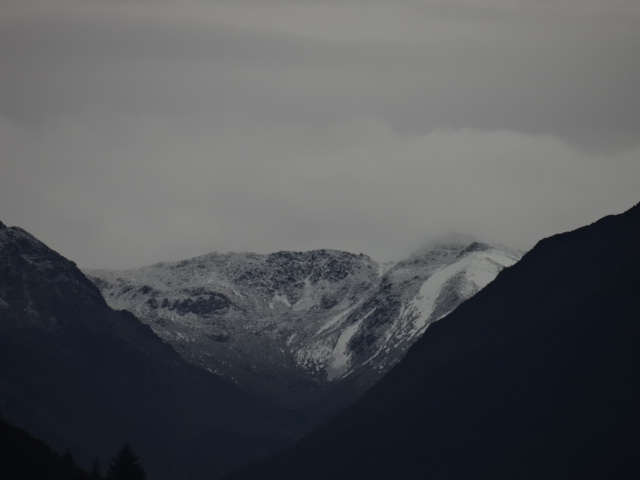

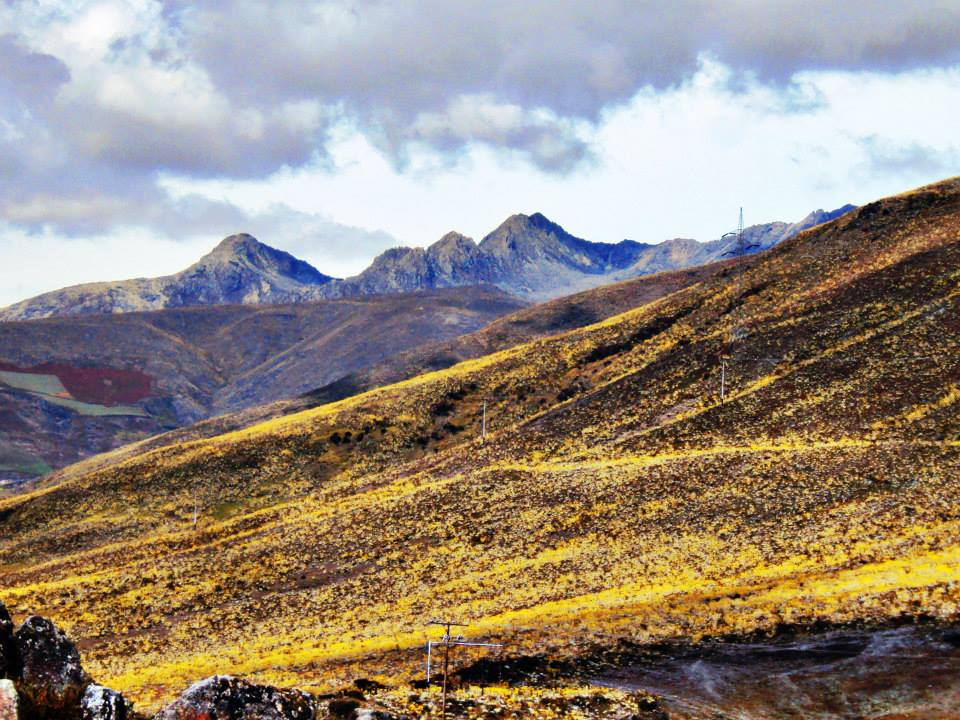

== See also ==
- Merida glaciation
- Sierra Nevada de Merida
- Sierra de Santo Domingo
