= Asahina =

Asahina (written: 朝比奈 or 朝日奈) is a Japanese surname, which means "sunny place". Notable people with the surname include:

== People ==
- Akari Asahina (朝日奈あかり; born 1988), Japanese actress
- Asahina clan (朝比奈氏), a Japanese clan during the Sengoku period
- Aya Asahina (朝比 奈彩; born 1993), Japanese actress and model
- Junko Asahina (朝比奈 順子; 1953–2021), stage name for Japanese actress Akiko Echigo
- Madoka Asahina (朝日奈 丸佳; born 1993), Japanese voice actress
- Miyoko Asahina (朝比奈 三代子; born 1969), Japanese long-distance runner
- Sarah Asahina (朝比奈 沙羅; born 1996), Japanese judo fighter
- Sōgen Asahina (朝比奈 宗源; 1891 – 1979), 20th century Rinzai Zen monk
- Syoziro Asahina (朝比奈 正二郎; 1913–2010), Japanese entomologist
- Takashi Asahina (朝比奈 隆; 1908–2001), Japanese conductor
- Yasuhiko Asahina (朝比奈 泰彦; 1881–1975), Japanese lichenologist and chemist
- Asahina Yasutomo (1538–?), officer under the Imagawa clan
- Asahina Yoshihide (朝比奈 義秀), (also known as Asahina Saburō) Japanese warrior of the early 13th century, and son of Wada Yoshimori
- Yuya Asahina (朝比奈 ゆうや; born 1980), Japanese manga author and artist

=== Fictional characters ===
- Yuko Asahina (朝日奈 夕子) from Tokimeki Memorial
- Mafuyu Asahina (朝比奈 まふゆ), character from Hatsune Miku: Colorful Stage!
- Arumi Asahina (朝比奈 あるみ), character from Magical☆Shopping Arcade Abenobashi
- Hiroko Asahina (朝比奈 浩子), character from RahXephon
- Kaoru Asahina (朝比奈 薫), character from Junjo Romantica
- Kyoko Asahina (朝比奈 京子), character from Diamond Daydreams
- Kyoko Asahina (朝日奈 今日子), mother of Mirai Asahina from Witchy PreCure!
- Daikichi Asahina (朝日奈 大吉), father of Mirai Asahina
- Mikuru Asahina (朝比奈 みくる), character from The Melancholy of Haruhi Suzumiya
- Mitsuki Asahina (朝比奈 睦月), character from Haunted Junction
- Suzuka Asahina (朝比奈 涼風), character from Suzuka
- Aoi Asahina (朝日奈 葵), character from Danganronpa
- Yuta Asahina (朝日奈 悠太), character from Danganronpa
- Masaomi Asahina (朝日奈 雅臣), character from Brothers Conflict
- Ukyo Asahina (朝日奈 右京), character from Brothers Conflict
- Kaname Asahina (朝日奈 要), character from Brothers Conflict
- Hikaru Asahina (朝日奈 光), character from Brothers Conflict
- Natsume Asahina (朝日奈 棗), character from Brothers Conflict
- Azusa Asahina (朝日奈 梓), character from Brothers Conflict
- Tsubaki Asahina (朝日奈 椿), character from Brothers Conflict
- Louis Asahina (朝日奈 琉生), character from Brothers Conflict
- Subaru Asahina (朝日奈 昴), character from Brothers Conflict
- Iori Asahina (朝日奈 祈織), character from Brothers Conflict
- Yusuke Asahina (朝日奈 侑介), character from Brothers Conflict
- Fuuto Asahina (朝日奈 風斗), character from Brothers Conflict
- Wataru Asahina (朝日奈 弥), character from Brothers Conflict
- Miwa Asahina (朝日奈 美和), character from Brothers Conflict
- Hiyori Asahina (朝比奈 日和), character from Kagerou Project
- Kikuno Asahina (浅雛 菊乃), character from Sket Dance
- Mirai Asahina (朝日奈 みらい), character from Maho Girls PreCure!

== See also ==
- 5230 Asahina, a main-belt asteroid
