= Thamnolia papelillo =

Scientific classification
- Kingdom: Fungi
- Division: Ascomycota
- Class: Lecanoromycetes
- Order: Pertusariales
- Family: Icmadophilaceae
- Genus: Thamnolia
- Species: T. papelillo

Binomial name
- Thamnolia papelillo R.Sant. (2004)

Synonyms
- Thamnolia papelillo var. subsolida (M.Satô) R.Sant. (2004); Thamnolia subuliformis var. subsolida M.Satô (1968)

Species of lichen

Thamnolia papelillo is a species of whiteworm lichen in the family Icmadophilaceae. It was described as a new species in 2004 by Norwegian lichenologist Rolf Santesson. It is found in Peru, where it grows on grazed grass steppe. Until Santesson's publication, it had been considered a variety of Thamolia vermicularis. It differs from T. vermicularis in having flat and wide podetia and a distribution restricted to South America.
