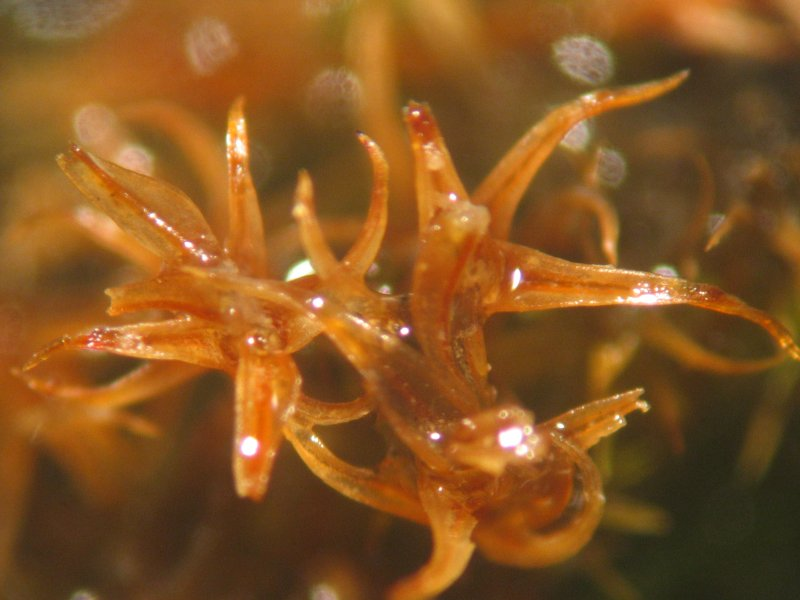

Scientific classification
- Kingdom: Plantae
- Division: Bryophyta
- Class: Bryopsida
- Subclass: Dicranidae
- Order: Dicranales
- Family: Dicranaceae
- Genus: Dichodontium
- Species: D. pellucidum

Binomial name
- Dichodontium pellucidum W.P.Schimper, 1856

= Dichodontium pellucidum =

Species of moss

Dichodontium pellucidum is a species of moss belonging to the family Dicranaceae.

It has cosmopolitan distribution.
