= Thamnolia juncea =

Scientific classification
- Kingdom: Fungi
- Division: Ascomycota
- Class: Lecanoromycetes
- Order: Pertusariales
- Family: Icmadophilaceae
- Genus: Thamnolia
- Species: T. juncea

Binomial name
- Thamnolia juncea R.Sant. (2004)

Synonyms
- Thamnolia juncea var. subjuncea R.Sant. (2004)

Species of lichen

Thamnolia juncea is a species of whiteworm lichen in the family Icmadophilaceae. It was described as a new species in 2004 by Norwegian lichenologist Rolf Santesson. It is found in Papua New Guinea, where it grows on the ground in subalpine or alpine grassland.
