= Thamnogalla crombiei =

Scientific classification
- Kingdom: Fungi
- Division: Ascomycota
- Class: Leotiomycetes
- Order: Cyttariales
- Family: Cordieritidaceae
- Genus: Thamnogalla
- Species: T. crombiei

Binomial name
- Thamnogalla crombiei (Mudd) D.Hawksw. (1980)

Synonyms
- Endocarpon crombiei Mudd (1865); Sphaeria crombiei (Mudd) Zopf (1896); Pharcidia crombiei (Mudd) Sacc. & D.Sacc. (1905); Nesolechia vermicularis Arnold (1874); Stegia vermicularis (Arnold) Keissl. (1925)

Genus of fungi

Thamnogalla crombiei is a species of lichenicolous fungus in the family Cordieritidaceae. It uses Thamnolia vermicularis as a host.
