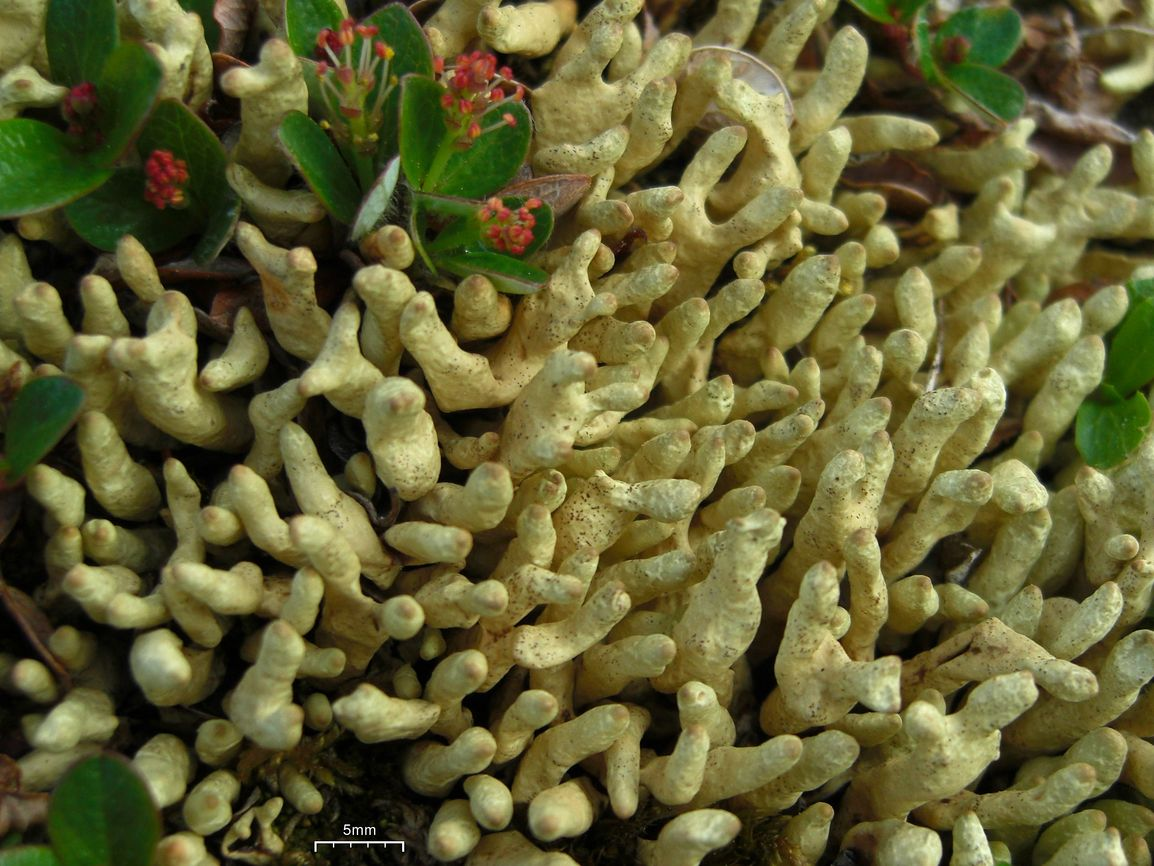
- Dactylina arctica

Scientific classification
- Domain: Eukaryota
- Kingdom: Fungi
- Division: Ascomycota
- Class: Lecanoromycetes
- Order: Lecanorales
- Family: Parmeliaceae
- Genus: Dactylina; Nyl. (1860)

Type species
- Dactylina arctica (Hook.f.) Nyl. (1860)

Synonyms
- Dufoureomyces Cif. & Tomas. (1953)

= Dactylina =

Genus of fungi

Dactylina is a genus of lichen-forming fungi in the family Parmeliaceae. The genus was circumscribed by Finnish botanist William Nylander in 1860, with Dactylina arctica assigned as the type species.

== Species ==
- Dactylina arctica (Richardson) Nyl. (1860)
- Dactylina beringica C.D.Bird & J.W.Thomson (1978)
- Dactylina chinensis Follmann (1968)
- Dactylina muricata (Laurer) Tuck. (1872)
- Dactylina ramulosa (Hook.f.) Tuck. (1862)
