= Pico Piedras Blancas =

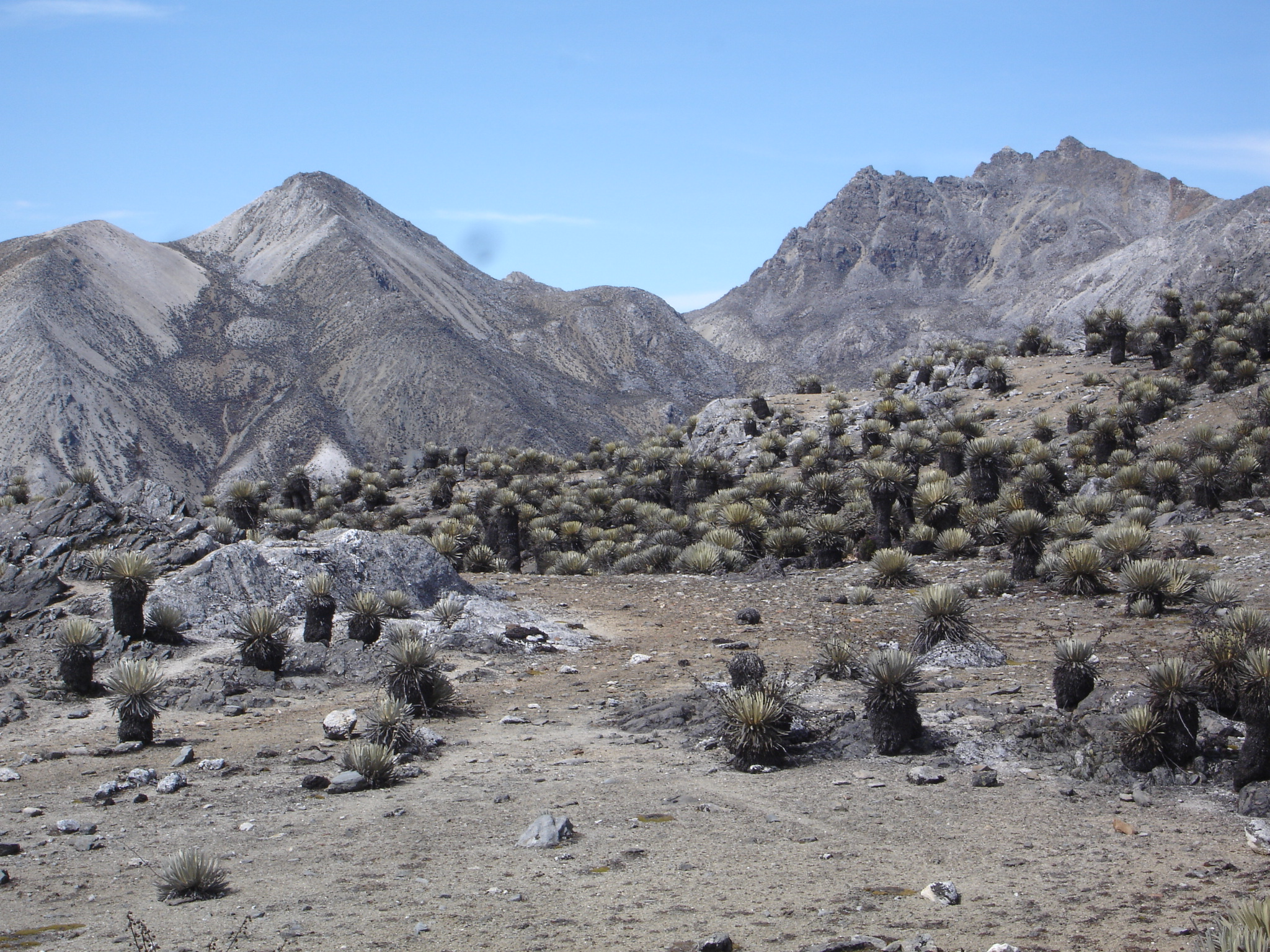
- Pico Piedras Blancas (Right) and Pico Mucumamó (left) seen from Alto de Mifafí

Highest point
- Elevation: 4,737 m (15,541 ft)
- Prominence: 1,158 m (3,799 ft)
- Coordinates: 8°51′N 71°57′W

Geography
- Location: Mérida, Mérida, Venezuela
- Parent range: Sierra de la Culata, Andes

Climbing
- First ascent: Unknown, however
- Easiest route: Walk, easy climb PD

The Pico Piedras Blancas (also known as Misamán), at 4,737 metres (15,541 ft), is the highest mountain of the Sierra de la Culata range in the Mérida State, and the fifth-highest mountain in Venezuela. Its name, meaning "White Stones", is of uncertain origin, since the massif is predominantly grey in color. Pico Piedras Blancas lacks glaciers; however, seasonal snowfalls may briefly cover its flanks. From its summit and under clear conditions, Lake Maracaibo can be seen. One of the accesses to reach the base of the mountain, is through the Mifafí Condor Reserve, which hosts some specimens of this andean bird.

== Location ==
Pico Piedras Blancas is located 35 km (22 mi) to the northeast of Mérida, the state capital. Pico Piedras Blancas is very close to Pico Mucumamó, Pico Los Nevados and Pico El Buitre; all of them surround a high altitude valley in the heart of the Sierra de la Culata at approximately 4,200 metres (13,800 ft) above sea level, known on topographic maps as Hoyo Negro ("Black Hole").

== Elevation ==
A former measure of 4,762 metres, given by Jahn in 1910, was corrected to 4,737 metres in 1951. The latter measure was confirmed by a 2002 GPS survey.

== Climbing ==
Though being the highest mountain of the Sierra de la Culata, it is not as frequently climbed as Pico Pan de Azucar in the same range of La Culata or the highest peaks of the Sierra Nevada de Mérida range.

- Piedras Blancas can be best climbed during the dry season, from October to March
- The principal accesses are two: through the Mifafí Condor Reserve, near Casa de Gobierno in the Trasandina road, and through the town of La Toma, nearby Mucuchíes, also in the Trasandina road
- The normal route is through the eastern side of the massif
