= Duby =

Duby is a surname. It may refer to:

- Caroline Duby Glassman (1922–2013), U.S. attorney and jurist
- Craig Duby (born 1949), Australian politician
- Dora Duby (1901–1998), American dancer
- Georges Duby (1919–1996), French historian
- Heather Duby (born 1974), U.S. singer/songwriter
- Jacques Duby (1922–2012), French actor
- Jean Étienne Duby (1798–1885), Swiss clergyman and botanist,
- Virginie Duby-Muller (born 1979), French politician
