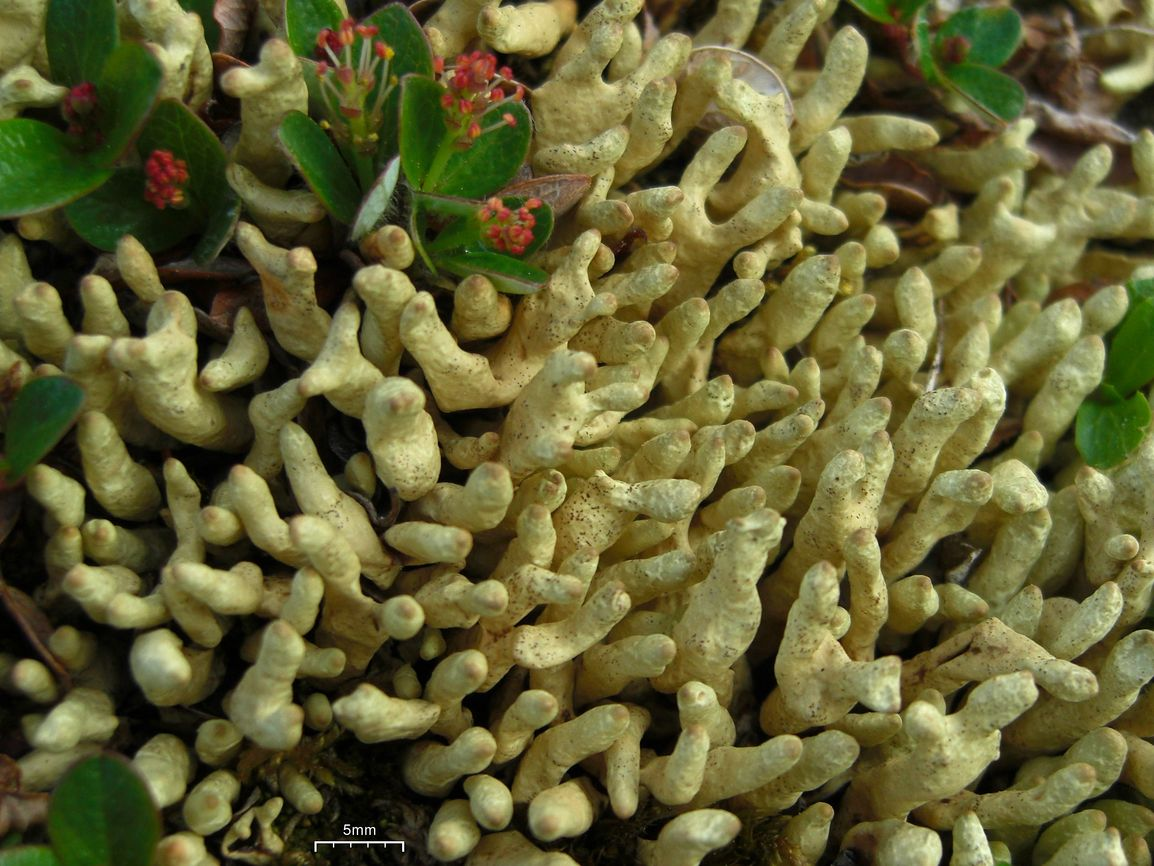

Conservation status
- Secure (NatureServe)

Scientific classification
- Kingdom: Fungi
- Division: Ascomycota
- Class: Lecanoromycetes
- Order: Lecanorales
- Family: Parmeliaceae
- Genus: Dactylina
- Species: D. arctica

Binomial name
- Dactylina arctica (Hook. f.) Nyl. (1860)

Synonyms
- Dufourea arctica Richardson (1823)

= Dactylina arctica =

Species of lichen

Dactylina arctica is a species of fungus within the family Parmeliaceae. Common names for this lichen are butterfinger lichen and Arctic finger lichen. A specific area in which this lichen occurs is represented by the boreal forests of Canada.

== See also ==
- Reindeer lichen
