= Frost boil =

Small circular mounds of fresh soil material formed by frost action and cryoturbation

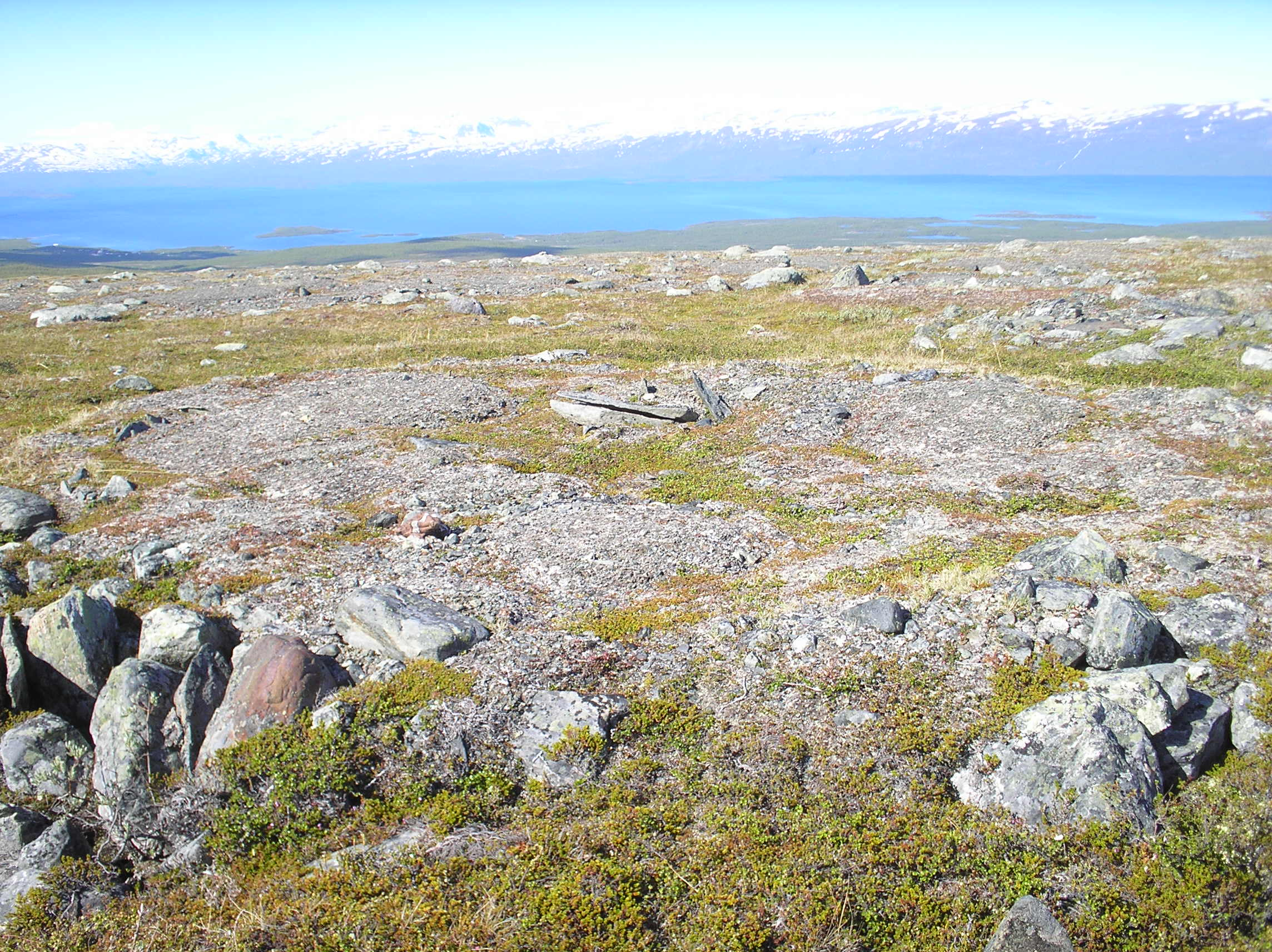
Mud boils near Lapporten, Sweden

A frost boil, also known as mud boils, a stony earth circles, frost scars, or mud circles, are small circular mounds of fresh soil material formed by frost action and cryoturbation. They are found typically found in periglacial or alpine environments where permafrost is present, and may damage roads and other man-made structures. They are typically 1 to 3 metres in diameter.

Frost boils are amongst the most common features of patterned ground, the pervasive process shaping the topology of soils in periglacial regions. They generally form regular patterns of polygons. Frost boils are a type of nonsorted circle, and are characterized from other circles by barren centres of mineral soil and intercircle regions filled with vegetation and peat. It is named after skin boils due to similarities in their formation processes, although subsequent research has shown other methods of formation.

Frost boils have been observed on Mars, indicating the presence of periglacial processes similar to those on Earth.

== Formation ==
The most accepted theory involves cryoturbation caused by differences in moisture conditions and ground temperature. Other recent research posits that frost boils are formed by several interacting mechanisms, including differential frost heaving, load casting, convection, frost cracking, mass displacement, and soil sorting. The traditional model of injection, however, may still apply for some frost boils. Models generally presume soil is predominately silt or clay, for the reasons listed under the injection subsection.

=== Injection ===
Frost boils occur in soils of poorly-sorted sediments with significant silt and/or clay content. These soils include perennially frozen till, marine clay, colluvium, and other muds. These soils have low liquid limits, low plasticity limits, and high natural moisture contents. These soils liquefy and flow readily in response to slight changes to either internal or external stress, or a change in water content. Localized stresses are often the result of moisture being confined in the active layer by the underlying permafrost and a semi-rigid carapace of dried surface mud, created by desiccation during the late summer. The moisture content of soils may increase during summer due to rain. Other stresses include the volumetric change of water during the freezing and thawing, and the flow of groundwater.

The subsequent increase of hydrostatic, artesian, and/or pore water pressure pressures on slopes. When internal stresses cannot be contained, the semi-rigid surface layer ruptures. The saturated mud bursts above the surface, creating a mud boil.

=== Soil Liquefaction ===
This process is analogous to the formation of sand boils. Where soils are badly drained, soil temperatures are more sensitive to changes in the atmospheric temperature. Soil aggregates are less stable near the surface as freezing occurs more rapidly. Deeper soils experience longer periods of stability due to freeze drying, or cryodesiccation. Deeper soils also experience greater stresses due to the secondary refreezing of soil in late autumn. As a result, the introduction of additional water due to thaw or groundwater flows is likely to cause deeper soil to liquefy and deform like plastic. The high viscosity of water close to 0 °C promotes aggregate explosion and particle dispersion.

This process is commonplace in alpine regions where soil temperatures rarely drop below -10 °C.

=== Cyroturbation ===
Soil that are silty or loamy, as described above, can hold larger moisture contents. Thus, segregated ice lenses are formed preferentially in these locations. The soil thus experiences greater frost heave than surrounding regions, becoming more highly elevated than its surroundings. Although the ice lenses melt during summer, the ground does not fully subside into its original elevation and remains at a slightly higher elevation than before. Over years, soil particles are preferentially transported upwards to form a frost boil. At the surface of the boil, soil creep takes place and soil are transported towards the rim where it is inter-mixed with organic soil from the active layer. Over many years, this process creates distinct organic soil horizons in inter-boil areas. Permeating ground water eventually carries dissolved organic material and particles downwards through the process of leaching. These particles accumulate in segregated ice lenses, and the cycle repeats.

Cyroturbation of this type is a slow process, often taking centuries for a single cycle.

== Internal characteristics ==
Frost heaving is greater at the center of frost boils when compared to the margins of frost boils due to the ice-rich conditions at the center and vegetative cover at the margins. Due to the higher moisture content, ice predominantly forms segregated ice lenses in shallow soils near the center of the frost boil. Moisture content at the margins, however, is predominantly in the form of pore ice. Ground subsistence at the center of frost boils during thawing season is correspondingly more rapid and of a greater magnitude when compared to the margins. Subsidence at the margins advances slowly in the earlier thawing period but increases to rates comparable to center by mid-summer.

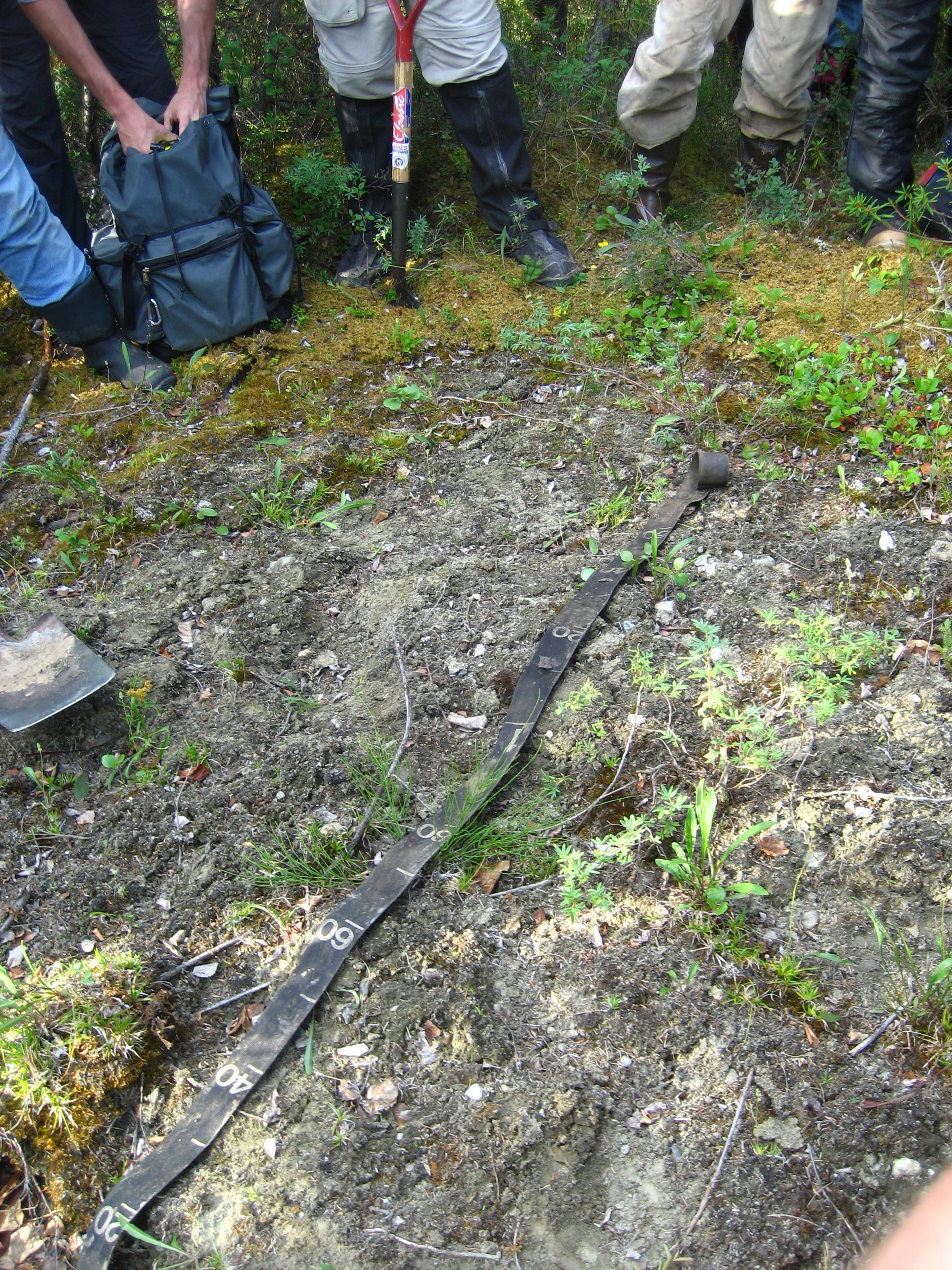

Measurements conducted on frost boils in Adventdalen, Svalbard has found that the ground subsistence rates at center of frost boils of averaged 8 mm per day during late May but decreased to less than 1 mm per day in mid-July. The same found that heaving was considerably greater at centers (c. 9.5 mm per day) than margins (c. 1.6 mm per day). Correspondingly, ice core analyses conducted on frost boils has found that samples extracted from the center of Frost Boils have higher concentration of ice lenses in shallow soils, when compared to cores extracted from marginal and intercircle regions. Most ice lenses have a diameter smaller than 3 mm.

== Topology ==
Frost boils often occur in groups, and may form terraces if a series of them occur on a slope. On slopes, frost boils are sometimes protected from erosion by a thin layer of mosses and lichens which retains moisture through surface tension as sediments flow downslope to form a lobe. These landforms eventually settle like a caterpillar track.

Common characteristics of landforms created by frost boils include a bowl-shaped boil, an elevated center, a formation of an organic layer on the outer edge, and resistance of the soil surface to vegetation colonization.

Drainage on frost boils differs as a result of micro relief across the frost boil surface. In warm seasons (summer), the elevated center of the frost boil is moderately well drained compared to the depressed inter boil. The permafrost table surface is also affected by differing activity across the boil. The inner boil is more active and generally has more than twice the active depth than the inter boil, which causes the permafrost table surface to be in a nearly perfect bowl shape.

== Biology ==
Frost boils may be the predominant form of topology and patterned ground in tundras. Three elements of frost boils may repeat over large areas: patches (the center of frost boils), rims, and troughs. The density of these elements are higher in the high arctic when compared to southern tundras. Each element of frost boils is a distinct microecosystem. Although vegetation is rare on patches, it may host many species of small mosses, crustose lichens, and solitary small vascular plants. Well-developed moss covers the surface of most rims and troughs. Rims and troughs are also home to a large number of herbs and small or stunted shrubs.

Arctic soils acidify over time due to the presence of aerobic bacteria which breaks down water-soluble salts within soil moisture, reducing the fertility of most periglacial regions. Cryoturbation within active frost boils may allow water containing basic salts to permeate from depth to the surface, neutralizing soil acidity and replenishing the supply of nutrients. Nutrients in plant matter, particularly carbon and nitrogen, are deposited and concentrated in troughs. These nutrients are intensely recycled in each stage of ecological succession. Troughs thus have an overall higher net ecosystem production and carbon accumulation rate than patches. Other reasons contributing to the greater carbon accumulation in troughs include a higher soil moisture content that makes troughs unfavorable for decomposition. Troughs may also have a higher carbon content due to it being older and having experienced a longer period of soil formation.

The presence of plants affect the development of frost boils. In the high arctic where plants are rare, physical processes of heave and soil formation are dominant. In warmer temperate regions, dense vegetation insulates inter-boil areas, lowering soil temperatures and decreasing the potential for heave. The strong contrast between vegetated inter-boil regions and center patches lead to maximum differential heave, resulting in frost boils being better developed.

== See also ==
- Patterned ground
- Sand boil
- Permafrost
- Ice wedge
- Pingo
- Cryoturbation
