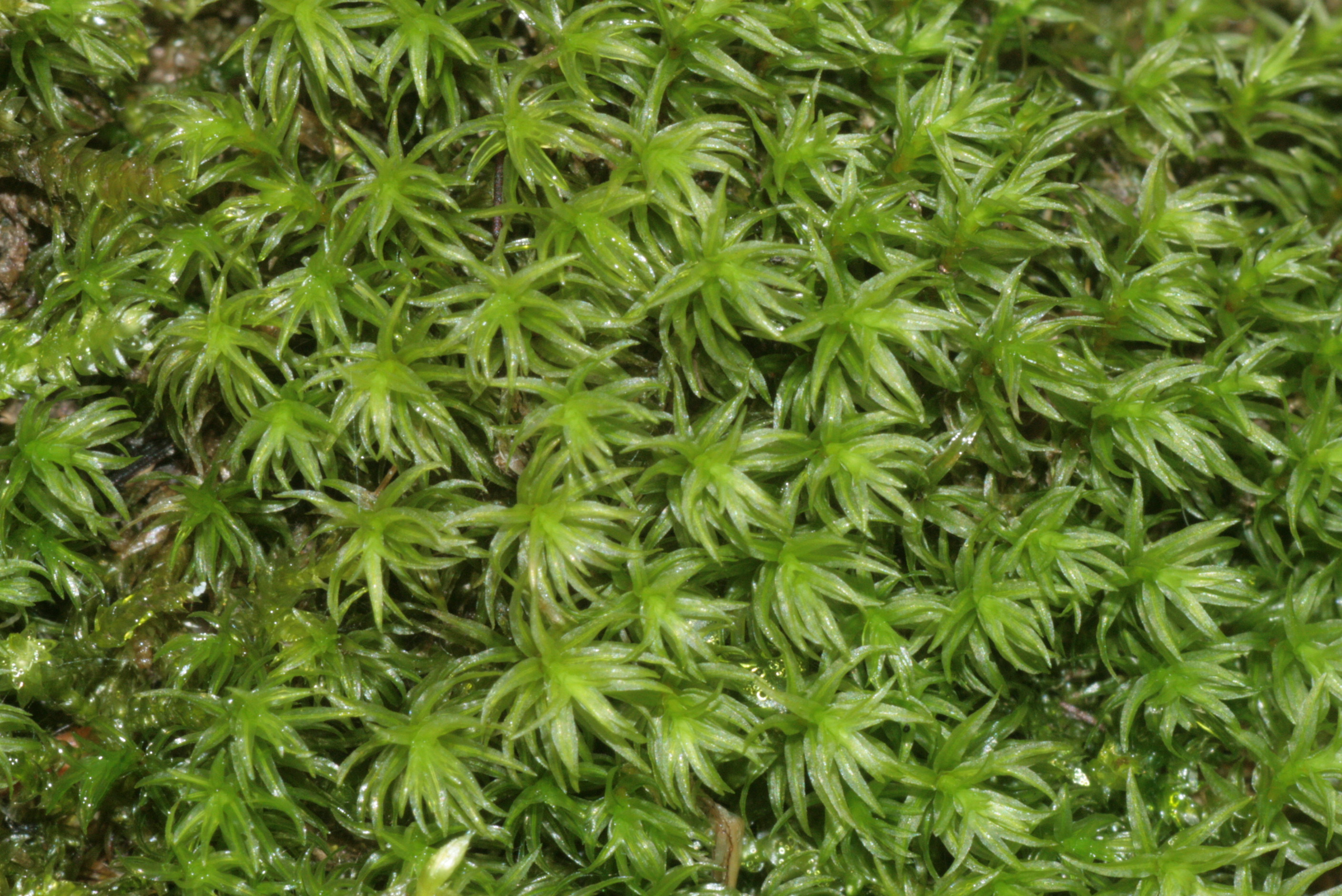
- Dichodontium pellucidum

Scientific classification
- Kingdom: Plantae
- Division: Bryophyta
- Class: Bryopsida
- Subclass: Dicranidae
- Order: Dicranales
- Family: Dicranaceae
- Genus: Dichodontium; Schimp.

= Dichodontium =

Genus of mosses

Dichodontium is a genus of mosses belonging to the family Dicranaceae.

The genus was first described by Wilhelm Philippe Schimper.

The genus has cosmopolitan distribution.

Selected species:

- Dichodontium pellucidum Schimp., 1856
