= Asahina clan =

The Asahina clan (朝比奈氏) was a Japanese clan during the Sengoku period who served the Imagawa clan of Suruga Province as retainer. Two genealogies of the clan were known. The one says that it had roots in Fujiwara clan. The other says that the clan was descended from Wada Yoshimori; his third son Yoshihide adopted the name "Asahina".
