= Pico Pan de Azúcar =

Mountain in Venezuela

- Pico Pan de Azúcar as seen from the East at Alto de Mucujún

Highest point
- Elevation: 4,680 m (15,350 ft)
- Coordinates: 8°48′N 70°59′W

Geography
- Location: Mérida state, Venezuela
- Parent range: Sierra de la Culata, Andes

Climbing
- First ascent: Wilhem Sievers, June 5th, 1885
- Easiest route: Walk, easy climb PD

The Pico Pan de Azúcar, at 4680 meters above sea level, is the ninth highest mountain of Venezuela, and the third highest of the Sierra de la Culata range in the Mérida State. Its name, which translates as "Bread of Sugar", is due to the sandy slopes of the mountain, which resembles "Pan dulce", a kind of bread sprinkled with sugar eaten in the country. The summit offers a scenic view, including Lake Maracaibo, Sierra Nevada de Mérida and the surrounding mountains of the Sierra de la Culata.

== Location ==
Pico Pan de Azúcar is located 27.7 kilometers to the Northeast of Mérida, Mérida, the capital city of the state. The mountain, along with other mountains surrounds a high altitude valley around 4300 meters above sea level, which is the birth of the Mucujún river

== History ==
The first ascent, made by the German explorer Wilhem Sievers, dates from 1885. In 1910, Alfredo Jahn, an engineer working as leader of an Expedition commissioned for surveying the western of Venezuela, climbed the mountain, however, Jahn named the mountain "Tucaní" and on the other hand named "Pan de Azúcar" another neighbor mountain now known as Pan de Sal.

== Climbing ==
Pan de Azúcar is one of the most climbed mountains in the Mérida state, due to its accessibility and fast approximation. It is best climbed during the dry season, from October to March. The principal access is through the "La Culata" settlement. The normal route is through the South ridge.
