= Thamnolic acid =

Names
- IUPAC name 5-(3-carboxy-2-hydroxy-4-methoxy-6-methylbenzoyl)oxy-3-formyl-2,4-dihydroxy-6-methylbenzoic acid

Identifiers
CAS Number	484-55-9
3D model (JSmol)	Interactive image
ChEBI	CHEBI:144235
ChemSpider	3522039
PubChem CID	4316933
- InChI: InChI=1S/C19H16O11/c1-6-4-9(29-3)12(18(26)27)15(23)10(6)19(28)30-16-7(2)11(17(24)25)13(21)8(5-20)14(16)22/h4-5,21-23H,1-3H3,(H,24,25)(H,26,27) Key: RNCJCRJLNVRWJX-UHFFFAOYSA-N
- SMILES: CC1=CC(=C(C(=C1C(=O)OC2=C(C(=C(C(=C2C)C(=O)O)O)C=O)O)O)C(=O)O)OC

Properties
Chemical formula	C_{19}H_{16}O_{11}
Molar mass	420.326 g·mol^{−1}
- Except where otherwise noted, data are given for materials in their standard state (at 25 °C [77 °F], 100 kPa). Infobox references

Thamnolic acid is a β-orcinol depside with the molecular formula C_{19}H_{16}O_{11}. Thamnolic acid was first isolated from the lichen Thamnolia vermicularis, but it also occur in Cladonia species.
