= Global Terrestrial Network for Permafrost =

International programme monitoring permafrost parameters

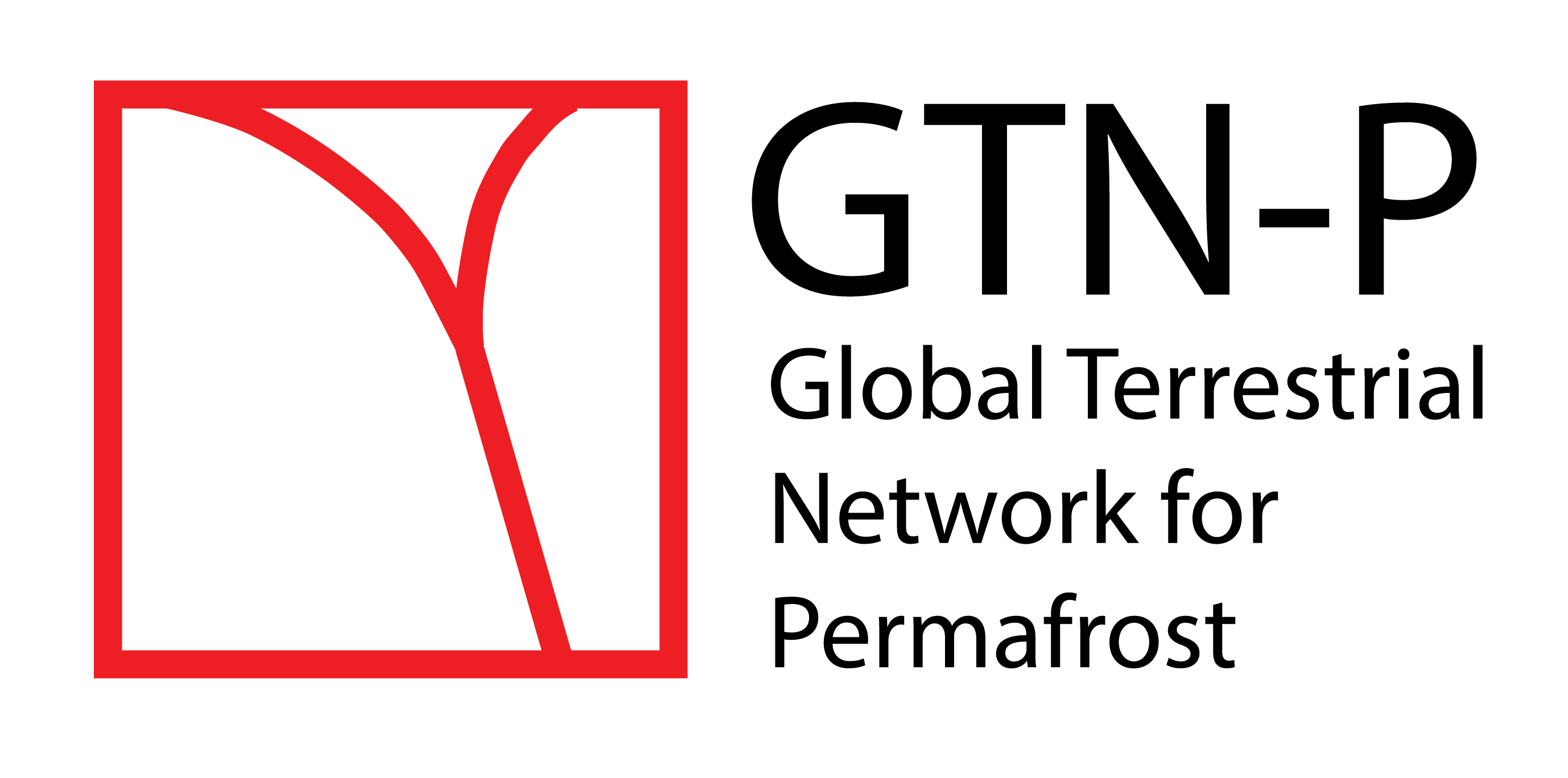
GTN-P program logo

The Global Terrestrial Network for Permafrost (GTN‐P) is the primary international programme concerned with monitoring permafrost parameters. GTN‐P was developed in the 1990s by the International Permafrost Association (IPA) under the Global Climate Observing System (GCOS) and the Global Terrestrial Observing System (GTOS), with the long-term goal of obtaining a comprehensive view of the spatial structure, trends and variability of changes in the active layer thickness and permafrost temperature.

According to the GTN-P website, "GCOS and GTOS established 50 essential climate variables (ECVs), of which one is permafrost. Within the GTN-P, involving the senior and young permafrost scientific community, two permafrost key variables have been identified as ECVs:

- the thermal state of permafrost (TSP), which is permafrost temperature, long-term monitored by an extensive borehole network
- the active layer thickness (ALT), which is the annual thaw depth of permafrost, mostly referring to the monitoring network of Circumpolar Active Layer Monitoring (CALM)"

== Network coordination ==
Permanent monitoring in GTN-P has been coordinated by the IPA since its establishment. TSP was originally based at the Geological Survey of Canada in Ottawa (GSC), Canada. The TSP observatories in the United States and Russia have been supported by the US National Science Foundation (NSF) and managed by the Geophysical Institute Permafrost Laboratory at the University of Alaska Fairbanks. Permafrost temperature data from these observatories are freely available at the dedicated US-Russian TSP website (www.permafrostwatch.org) and from the NSF Arctic Data Center. The latter provides preservation and access for all projects funded by NSF's Arctic Science Program.

=== CALM program ===
The CALM program was initially affiliated with and supported by the International Tundra Experiment (ITEX) in 1991. CALM has had operational bases at Rutgers University (1991–1994), the State University of New York (1994–1997), the University of Cincinnati (1998–2003), the University of Delaware (2003–2009) and is currently headquartered at George Washington University. Long-term support for data collection in Alaska and Russia has been provided by the U.S. NSF and data from all CALM sites are available through a dedicated CALM web site and the National Snow and Ice Data Center in Boulder, Colorado.

== Governance structure ==
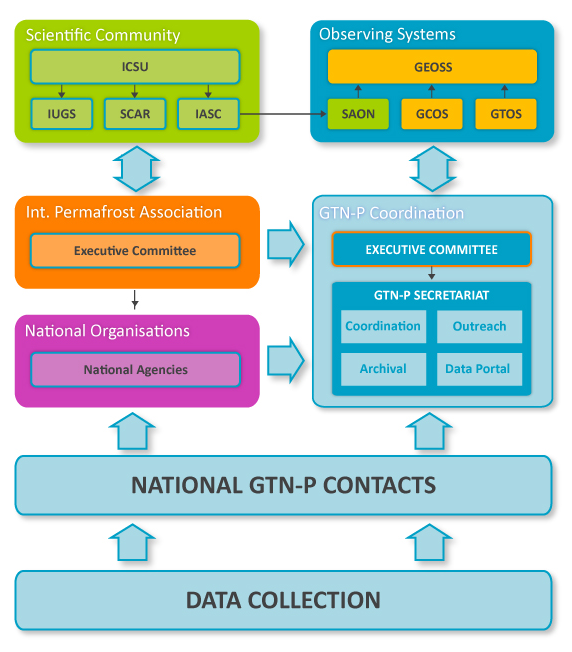
GTN-P management structure

The Global Terrestrial Network for Permafrost (GTN-P) governance structure aims to coordinate, manage, support and promote the GCOS and IPA initiative to monitor the thermal state of permafrost, which currently includes the active layer thickness and ground temperature in all permafrost regions of the Earth. GTN-P frames and adapts the best monitoring strategies and standards for permafrost monitoring in the context of existing and new developments in nature, science and technology. Members of the GTN-P governing board represent a wide palette of specialties involved in permafrost observation as well as specialists of data management.

The GTN-P governing board consists of the Steering Committee, the advisory board and the Secretariat.

=== Steering Committee ===
- the Steering Committee (SC) is the Governing body of the GTN-P
- the Steering Committee consists of not more than six members which are jointly nominated by leading GCOS, IPA and GTN-P representatives and the scientific community
- members of the SC are renewed every four years; re-election is possible
- activities of the SC are managed by the SC Chair, which is elected by the SC
- the SC meets approximately annually to assess the state of the international monitoring of permafrost
- the SC reviles the issues and establishes the agenda about which the advisory board shall be consulted
- the SC reports approximately annually on the GTN-P activities to the funding agencies and umbrella organizations of the GCOS and the IPA

=== Advisory board ===
- the advisory board is the body that provides non-binding strategic advice and scientific expertise to the management of GTN-P
- representatives to the Board are jointly nominated by the GTN-P Steering Committee, the IPA Steering Committee and the GTN-P Secretariat
- it will serve for four-year renewable terms, and will normally communicate electronically
- the advisory board advises the GTN-P, GCOS and IPA initiatives concerning present practice and future developments of the monitoring of permafrost, and also on the delivery of datasets to the wider permafrost community
- it periodically evaluates the work of the GTN-P Steering Committee and the GTN-P Secretariat in approximately four-year interval

=== Secretariat ===
- the Secretariat is the executing body that is managing the current business of the GTN-P
- the Secretariat is nominated by the GTN-P Steering Committee
- members of the Secretariat are renewed every four years; re-election is possible
- the Secretariat is responsible for the dialogue and linkages with other organizations, the periodic reporting and release of products for GTN-P and the financial management including fundraising
- it is responsible for the data management including integration, standardization, quality control, formatting, archiving and publishing of the GTN-P data
- activities are coordinated by the Director
- the Technical Director is responsible for the data management system
- the Secretariat coordinates the cooperation between the umbrella organizations of the GCOS and the IPA (led by the network coordinator)
- members communicate electronically on a regular basis
- members support the GTN-P Database and maintain the Data Management System
- it communicates with and supports the National Correspondents of GTN-P to facilitate the upload and quality control of TSP and CALM data to the GTN-P Database
- it reports annually to the Steering Committee and the advisory board about the status of the GTN-P Database and produce policy-relevant bulletins on GTN-P outputs

=== National Correspondents ===
- National Correspondents (NC) are proposed by the IPA national Adhering Bodies
- NC foster the implementation of the GTN-P strategy in their country
- NC are responsible for stimulating and coordinating the collection of data, quality control, and reporting by the individual investigators
- NC maintain close contacts with relevant institutions and funding agencies in their country and the IPA national Adhering Bodies

== GTN-P database ==
The GTN-P database is hosted at the Arctic Portal in Akureyri, Iceland. It is managed in close cooperation with the Alfred Wegener Institute for Polar and Marine Research in Potsdam, Germany, which was also the coordinator of the now-closed PAGE21 project within EU 7th framework programme, the main sponsor for the establishment of this database. The database management operates towards providing a web-based resource for essential climate variables (ECV) of the Global Terrestrial Network on Permafrost (GTN-P), aiming to enable the assessment of the relation between ground temperature, gas fluxes and the Earth's climate system. The database contains time series of borehole temperatures and grids of active layer thickness: TSP and ALT. The GTN-P database additionally contains air and surface temperature and moisture (DUE Permafrost, MODIS) measured in the terrestrial Panarctic, Antarctic and Mountainous realms.
