= International Tundra Experiment =

International Collaboration

The International Tundra Experiment (ITEX) is a long-term international collaboration of researchers examining the responses of arctic and alpine plants and ecosystems to climate change. Researchers measure plant responses to standardized, small-scale passive warming, snow manipulations, and nutrient additions. Researchers use small open-top chambers (OTCs) to passively increase mean air temperature by 1-2 °C. The ITEX approach has been validated by tundra responses at the plot level. The network has published meta-analyses on plant phenology, growth, and reproduction, composition and abundance, and carbon flux. The ITEX network consists of more than 50 sites in polar and alpine locations around the world.

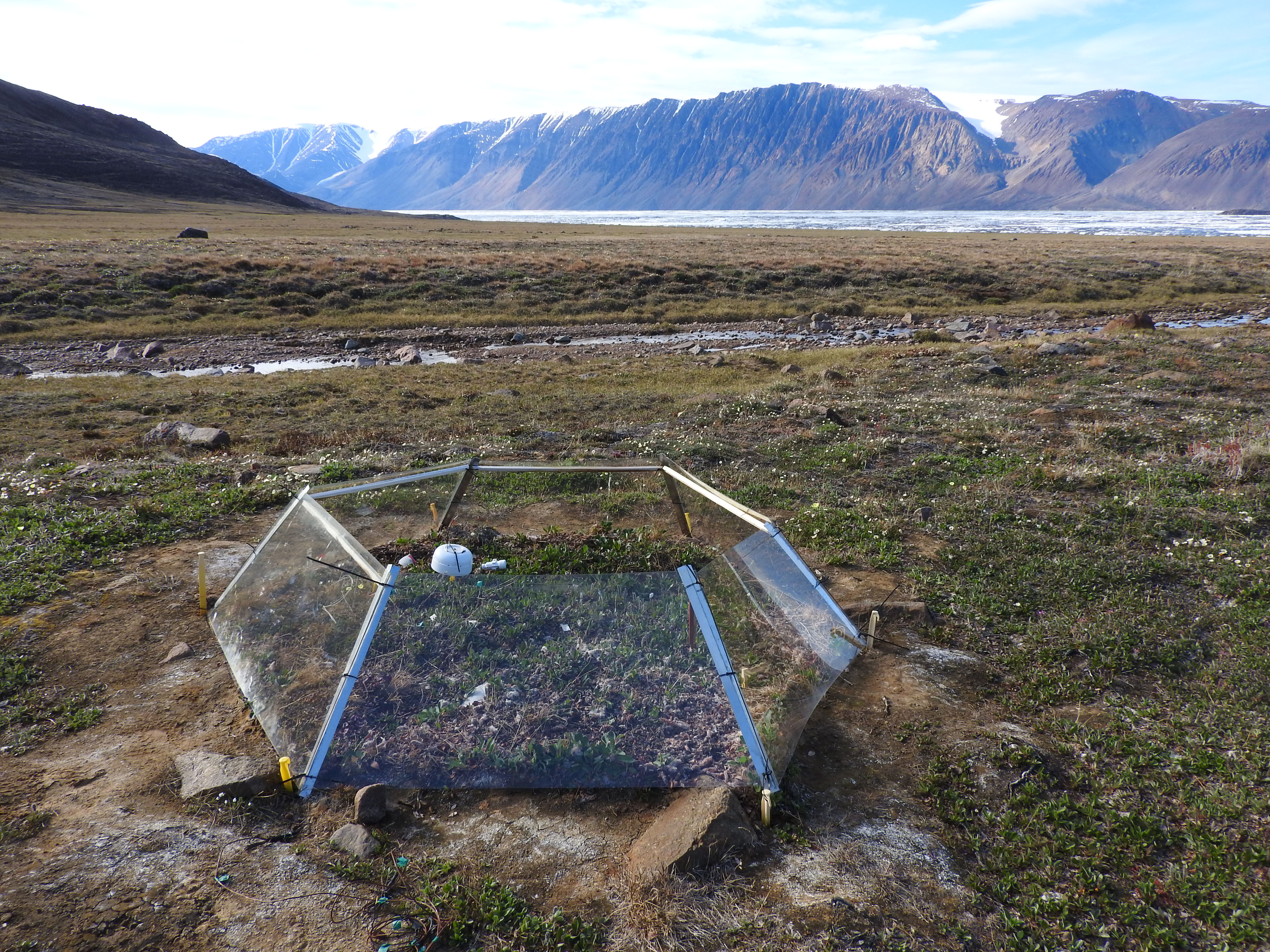
Open top chamber at Alexandra Fiord on Ellesmere Isl

== Canadian sites ==
=== Alexandra Fiord, Ellesmere Island ===
Name of site leader(s): Greg Henry

University: University of British Columbia

Site elevation: 0-100m

Latitude (WGS84 decimal degrees): 78.8833° N

Longitude (WGS84 decimal degrees): 75.8000° W

Date site was established: 1987

Does your site have OTC's? Yes

Number of plots at your site (include OTCs control plots, etc.) 90 OTCs 99 controls

When were they established? 1993

Have they been closed? If so, when? No

Is there grazing at your site? No

Climate data: Air temperature, Soil temperature, Snow depth, Precipitation, Cloud cover, Wind, global radiation etc.

Current or past data collection: Phenology, Point framing, Above ground plant traits, Flower counts, Fertilizer plots, Snowmelt dates, Snow addition and removal, GIS data, Drones (https://arcticdrones.org/), Phenocams (GoPros etc.), Transplant experiments, Plot photos, Soil moisture, Soil sampling, Succession studies

Main genera in OTC plots: Dryas, Salix, Cassiope, Vaccinium, Sedges, Grasses, Rushes, Saxifraga, Equisetum, Poppy, Oxyria, Draba, Mosses/Lichens, Fungi

Other nearby related study sites on Ellesmere: Sverdrup Pass, Princess Marie Bay, Hot Weather Creek,

=== Sverdrup Pass, Ellesmere Island, Nunavut ===
Name of site leader(s): Esther Lévesque, Josef Svoboda (1986-1994)

University: Université du Québec à Trois-Rivières (UQTR)

Site elevation: 180 m

Latitude (WGS84 decimal degrees): 79.14

Longitude (WGS84 decimal degrees): -79.7

Date site was established: 1990

Does your site have OTC's? No

Number of plots at your site (include OTCs control plots, etc.) 13 in total along altitudinal gradients (300m to ca. 700m) on two substrates (granite and dolomite) D1-D6 and G1-G7

When were they established? 1990

Have they been closed? If so, when? Yes, 1994

Is there grazing at your site? Insects, Ungulates, Hares (Lagomorphs)

Climate data: Air temperature >1m, Soil temperature, Precipitation, Soil temperature year-round (1986-1994)

Current or past data collection: Individual plant phenology, Above ground plant traits, Flower counts (total), Flower counts (per stage)

Main genera in plots: Papaver

=== Bylot Island, Nunavut ===
Name of site leader(s): Esther Lévesque

University: Université du Québec à Trois-Rivières

Latitude (WGS84 decimal degrees): 73.3652

Longitude (WGS84 decimal degrees): -79.0153

=== Nunatsiavut (Nain and Torr Bay) ===
Name of site leader(s): Laura Siegwart Collier, Luise Hermanutz

University: Memorial University

Latitude (WGS84 decimal degrees): 58.4774° N

Longitude (WGS84 decimal degrees): 62.8295° W

Date site was established: 2009

==== Nain ====
Does your site have OTC's? Yes

Number of plots at your site (include OTCs control plots, etc.) 18

When were they established? 2009

Have they been closed? If so, when? Yes, the subsite is closed

Is there grazing at your site? No

Climate data: Air temperature >1m, Soil temperature, PAR, Soil moisture probe

Current or past data collection: Point framing, Flower counts (total), Plot photos, Fruit production

Main genera in OTC plots: Betula, Vaccinium, Empetrum, Rhododendron, Carex, Bryophytes, Lichen

==== Torr Bay ====
Does your site have OTC's? Yes

Number of plots at your site (include OTCs control plots, etc.) 60

When were they established? 2009

Have they been closed? If so, when? No but visited infrequently (once 3–5 years)

Is there grazing at your site?

Climate data: Air temperature >1m Soil temperature, PAR, Soil moisture probe

Current or past data collection: Point framing, Flower counts (total), Fruit production

Main genera in OTC plots: Salix, Betula, Vaccinium, Empetrum, Rhododendron, Carex, Eriophorum, Poa, Juncus, Bryophytes, Lichen, Oxytropis

=== Tundra Ecosystem Research Station, Daring Lake ===
Tundra Ecosystem Research Station, Daring Lake: Name of site leader(s): Karin Clark

University: Government of the Northwest Territories

Latitude (WGS84 decimal degrees): 65 degrees 52 min N

Longitude (WGS84 decimal degrees): 111 degrees 32 min W

Date site was established: 1995

Does your site have OTC's? Currently have

Number of plots at your site (include OTCs control plots, etc.) 9

When were they established? Plots established 1995; OTCs in 2000

Have they been closed? If so, when? No

Is there grazing at your site? Yes

Climate data: Air temperature, Soil temperature, Snow depth, Precipitation, radiation, wind speed and direction

Current or past data collection: Phenology, Point framing, Above ground plant traits, Flower counts, Snowmelt dates

Main genera in OTC plots: Salix, Betula, Vaccinium, Sedges, Saxifraga, Oxytropis

=== Qikiqtaruk (Herschel Island), Yukon ===
Name of site leader(s): Isla Myers-Smith

University: University of Edinburgh, Yukon Parks

Site elevation: 70m

Latitude (WGS84 decimal degrees): 69.6 N

Longitude (WGS84 decimal degrees): 138.9 W

Date site was established: 1999

Does your site have OTC's? Never had

Number of plots at your site (include OTCs control plots, etc.) 12

When were they established? 1999

Have they been closed? If so, when? No

Is there grazing at your site? Yes

Climate data: Air temperature, Soil temperature, Snow depth, Precipitation

Current or past data collection: Phenology, Point framing, Above ground plant traits, Herbivory, Flower counts, Plot photos, Snowmelt dates, GIS data, Drones (https://arcticdrones.org/), Phenocams (GoPros etc.), Soil sampling, Shrub common garden

Main genera in OTC plots: Dryas, Salix, Betula, Sedges, Grasses, Mosses/Lichens

=== Garibaldi Park, BC, Canada ===
Garibaldi Park, BC, Canada:

Name of site leader(s): Cassandra Elphinstone, Courtney Collins, & Nathalie Chardon (2022-2024); Chelsea Little (2025–present)

University: University of British Columbia & Simon Fraser University

Site elevation: 1470m

Latitude (WGS84 decimal degrees): 49.927275

Longitude (WGS84 decimal degrees): -122.992919

Date site was established: 2022

Does your site have OTC's? Yes

Number of plots at your site (include OTCs control plots, etc.) 24

When were they established? 2022

Have they been closed? If so, when? No

Is there grazing at your site? Yes

Climate data: Plot level Air temperature, Soil temperature, radiation

Current or past data collection: Phenology, Point framing, Above ground plant traits, Flower counts, Phenocams (GoPros etc.), Plot photos, Soil moisture, Soil sampling

Main genera in OTC plots: Salix, Cassiope, Phyllodoce, Kalmia, Triantha, Pinguicula, Equisetum, Carex

== Greenlandic sites ==
=== Disko, Greenland ===
Name of site leader(s): Per Molgaard

University: University of Copenhagen

Site elevation: 10-100m

Latitude (WGS84 decimal degrees): 69.63N

Longitude (WGS84 decimal degrees): 42.17W

Date site was established: 1989 (last visit 2013)

Does your site have OTC's? No

Number of plots at your site (include OTCs control plots, etc.) 4

When were they established? 1992

Have they been closed? If so, when? Yes 1994

Is there grazing at your site? No

Climate data: Air temperature, Soil temperature, Snow depth, Precipitation

Current or past data collection: Phenology, Point framing, Above ground plant traits, Herbivory, Flower counts

Main genera in OTC plots: Salix, Papaver, Caterpillars on willow

=== Arctic Station, Disko, Greenland ===
Name of site leader(s): Anders Michelsen, Bo Elberling

University: University of Copenhagen

==== Mesic-dry heath tundra ====
Site elevation: 95m

Latitude (WGS84 decimal degrees): 69 16 N

Longitude (WGS84 decimal degrees): 53 27 W

Date site was established: 20Does your site have OTC's? Only snow fences

Number of plots at your site (include OTCs control plots, etc.) 48

When were they established? 2012

Have they been closed? If so, when? still running

Is there grazing at your site? Yes

Climate data: Air temperature, Soil temperature, Snow depth, Precipitation, Cloud cover

Current or past data collection: Point framing, Above ground plant traits, Below ground traits, Snow fences, Soil moisture, Drones, Soil sampling

Main genera in OTC plots: Dryas, Salix, Betula, Cassiope, Vaccinium, Sedges, Grasses, Mosses/Lichens

==== Wet sedge tundra ====
Site elevation: 85m

Latitude (WGS84 decimal degrees): 69 26 N

Longitude (WGS84 decimal degrees): 53 47 W

Date site was established: 2013

Does your site have OTC's? Only snow fences

Number of plots at your site (include OTCs control plots, etc.) 48

When were they established? 2013

Have they been closed? If so, when? still running

Is there grazing at your site? Yes

Climate data: Air temperature, Soil temperature, Snow depth, Precipitation, Cloud cover

Current or past data collection: Point framing, Above ground plant traits, Below ground traits, Snow fences, Snowmelt dates, Soil moisture, Drones, Soil sampling

Main genera in OTC plots: Salix, Sedges, Rushes, Equisetum, Mosses/Lichens

=== Zackenberg, Greenland ===
Name of site leader(s): Niels Martin Schmidt

University: Aarhus University

Site elevation: App. 55 m

Latitude (WGS84 decimal degrees): 74.47427

Longitude (WGS84 decimal degrees): -20.52895

Date site was established: 1996

Does your site have OTC's? Currently have

Number of plots at your site (include OTCs control plots, etc.) 20

When were they established? 2007

Have they been closed? If so, when? No

Is there grazing at your site? Yes

Climate data: Air temperature, Soil temperature, Snow depth, Precipitation, Cloud cover

Current or past data collection: Phenology, Point framing, Flower counts, Plot photos, Snowmelt dates, Soil moisture, Soil sampling

Main genera in OTC plots: Salix, Cassiope, Vaccinium, Grasses, Mosses/Lichens

=== Zackenberg, Greenland ===
Name of site leader(s): Anders Michelsen

University: University of Copenhagen

Site elevation: 35m

Latitude (WGS84 decimal degrees): 74 30 N

Longitude (WGS84 decimal degrees): 21 00 W

Date site was established: 2004

Does your site have OTC's? Yes

Number of plots at your site (include OTCs control plots, etc.) 20

When were they established? 2004

Have they been closed? If so, when?

Is there grazing at your site? Yes

Climate data: Air temperature, Soil temperature, Snow depth, Precipitation

Current or past data collection: Point framing, Snowmelt dates, Soil moisture

Main genera in OTC plots: Dryas, Salix, Cassiope, Vaccinium, Grasses, Mosses/Lichens

=== Kobbefjord (Nuuk), Greenland ===
Name of site leader(s): Katrine Raundrup

University: Greenland Institute of Natural Resources

Site elevation: 27 m

Latitude (WGS84 decimal degrees): 64.137147

Longitude (WGS84 decimal degrees): -51.379999

Date site was established: 2008

Does your site have OTC's? Yes

Number of plots at your site (include OTCs control plots, etc.) 30

When were they established? 2008

Have they been closed? If so, when? No

Is there grazing at your site? No

Climate data: Air temperature, Soil temperature, Snow depth, Precipitation, Cloud cover

Current or past data collection: Phenology, Above ground plant traits, Flower counts, Plot photos, Snowmelt dates, Soil moisture, GIS data, Soil sampling

Main genera in OTC plots: Salix, Sedges, Grasses, Mosses/Lichens, Empetrum

=== Kangerlussuaq, Greenland ===
Name of site leader(s): Eric Post

University: University of California, Davis

Site elevation: 200m

Latitude (WGS84 decimal degrees): 67.017

Longitude (WGS84 decimal degrees): -50.717

Date site was established: 2003

Does your site have OTC's? Yes

Subsites: KANGER.DOC, KANGER.DOPEY, KANGER.BASHFUL

== Fennoscandian sites ==
=== Auðkúluheiði, Iceland ===
Name of site leader(s): Ingibjörg S. Jónsdóttir

University: University of Iceland & University Centre in Svalbard

Site elevation: 450m

Latitude (WGS84 decimal degrees): 65°12'0" N

Longitude (WGS84 decimal degrees): 19°42'0" W

Date site was established: 1996

Does your site have OTC's? Yes

Number of plots at your site (include OTCs control plots, etc.) 30

When were they established? 1996

Have they been closed? If so, when? No

Is there grazing at your site? Yes

Climate data: Air temperature, Soil temperature, Precipitation, Total radiation, PAR

Current or past data collection: Phenology, Point framing, Above ground plant traits, Herbivory, Flower counts, Plot photos, Snowmelt dates, Soil moisture, Soil sampling

Main genera in OTC plots: Dryas, Salix, Betula, Vaccinium, Sedges, Grasses, Rushes, Equisetum, Silene, Cerastium, Mosses/Lichens, Empetrum

=== Landmannahellir/Löðmundarvatn at Fjallabak, Iceland ===
Landmannahellir/Löðmundarvatn at Fjallabak, Iceland

Name of site leader(s): Alejandro Salazar 2017–present; Ólafur S. Andrésson 2017-2019

University: University of Iceland, Faculty of Life and Environmental Sciences

Site elevation: 600m

Latitude (WGS84 decimal degrees): 64.0364

Longitude (WGS84 decimal degrees): 19.219017

Date site was established: 2017

Does your site have OTC's? Yes

Number of plots at your site (include OTCs control plots, etc.) 16

When were they established? 2018

Have they been closed? If so, when? No

Is there grazing at your site? Ungulates, Birds

Climate data: Soil temperature, Snowmelt date,

Current or past data collection: Soil moisture probe, Vegetation cover, microbial composition, soil respiration, N fixation, Plot photos, Below ground microbe surveys, CO_{2} Flux, Lichen cover, Bryophyte cover, Litter bags, Soil (chemical nutrient composition), N fixation (ARA), cyanobacteria cover on biocrust, soil respiration

Main genera in OTC plots: Salix, Empetrum, Carex, Bryophytes, Lichen, Liverwort (Anthelia) biocrust is the primary research subject and main ground cover (followed by moss).

=== Billefjorden, Svalbard ===
Name of site leader(s): Petr Macek

University: University of South Bohemia

Site elevation: 70m

Latitude (WGS84 decimal degrees): 78.5304

Longitude (WGS84 decimal degrees): 16.3070

Date site was established: 2014

Does your site have OTC's? Yes

Number of plots at your site (include OTCs control plots, etc.) 30

When were they established? 2015

Have they been closed? If so, when?

Is there grazing at your site? Yes

Climate data: Air temperature, Soil temperature, Precipitation, leaf temperatures

Current or past data collection: Plant cover (%), Above ground plant traits, Herbivory, Flower counts, Plot photos, Snowmelt dates, Soil moisture, Soil sampling

Main genera in OTC plots: Dryas, Salix, Cassiope, Sedges, Grasses, Rushes, Saxifraga, Equisetum, Silene, Cerastium, Oxyria, Mosses/Lichens

=== AWS1, Svalbard ===
Name of site leader(s):Petr Macek

University: University of South Bohemia

Site elevation:50

Latitude (WGS84 decimal degrees):78.717

Longitude (WGS84 decimal degrees):16.445

Date site was established: 2014

Does your site have OTC's?OTCs, Herbivory exclosure, Seeding experiments

Number of plots at your site (include OTCs control plots, etc.) 50

When were they established? 2015

Have they been closed? If so, when? No

Is there grazing at your site?Ungulates, Birds

Climate data:Air temperature >1m, Soil temperature

Current or past data collection: Individual plant phenology, Snapshot phenology, Above ground plant traits, Flower counts (total), Plot photos, Transplant experiments, Plant abundance measure (other than point framing), Lichen cover, Bryophyte cover, Plant tissue nutrient composition, Litter bags Reciprocal transplant experiment, Dark diversity (species richness)

Main genera in OTC plots:Dryas, Salix, Carex, Saxifraga, Silene, Cerastium, Oxyria, Draba, Equisetum, Bryophytes

=== Adventdalen Wet and Mesic, Svalbard ===
Name of site leader(s): Elisabeth J Cooper

University: UiT The Arctic University of Norway

Site elevation: 50

Latitude (WGS84 decimal degrees):78.16

Longitude (WGS84 decimal degrees): 16.1

Date site was established: 2003

Does your site have OTC's? OTCs, Goose grazing

When were they established? 2003

Have they been closed? If so, when? Yes, 2015

=== SAdvent, Svalbard ===
Name of site leader(s): Elisabeth J Cooper

University: UiT The Arctic University of Norway

Site elevation: 50

Latitude (WGS84 decimal degrees):78.16

Longitude (WGS84 decimal degrees): 16.1

Date site was established: 2006

Does your site have OTC's? OTCs (occasionally), Snow fences, Snow removal

When were they established? 2006

Have they been closed? If so, when? No

=== Endalen, Svalbard ===
Name of site leader(s): Ingibjorg Jonsdottir

University: University of Iceland & University Centre in Svalbard

Site elevation: 100 m

Latitude (WGS84 decimal degrees): 78.187445

Longitude (WGS84 decimal degrees): 15.75835

Date site was established: 2002

Does your site have OTC's? Yes OTCs

Sub-sites: Dryas Heath, Cassiope Low, Cassiope High, Fellfield, Snowbed Low, Snowbed High

=== Faroe Islands ===
Name of site leader(s): Magnus Gaard, Anna Maria Fosaa

University: University of the Faroe Islands

Site elevation: 600 m

Latitude (WGS84 decimal degrees): 62.0667

Longitude (WGS84 decimal degrees): -6.95

Date site was established: 2001

Does your site have OTC's? Yes

=== Knutshø, Dovre, Norway ===
Name of site leader(s): Annika Hofgaard

University: Norwegian Institute for Nature Research (NINA)

Site elevation: 1050-1150m

Latitude (WGS84 decimal degrees): 62 18' N

Longitude (WGS84 decimal degrees): 09 37' E

Date site was established: 1998

Does your site have OTC's? Yes

Number of plots at your site (include OTCs control plots, etc.) 3

When were they established? 1998

Have they been closed? If so, when?

Is there grazing at your site? Yes

Climate data: No, two year of air and soil temperature data (ambient and OTC) at the start of site use

Current or past data collection: Above ground plant traits, Herbivory, Plot photos, plant cover (%)

Main genera in OTC plots: Salix, Betula, Vaccinium, Sedges, Grasses, Rushes, Equisetum, Mosses/Lichens, Empetrum, Astragalus and a number of other dwarf shrubs and herbs

=== Finse, Norway ===
Name of site leader(s): Kari Klanderud

University: Norwegian University of Life Sciences

Site elevation: 1500 m asl

Latitude (WGS84 decimal degrees): 60.6051° N

Longitude (WGS84 decimal degrees): 7.5046° E

Date site was established: June 2000

Does your site have OTC's? Yes

Number of plots at your site (include OTCs control plots, etc.) 40 OTCs 40 controls

When were they established? 2000

Have they been closed? If so, when? No

Is there grazing at your site? Yes

Climate data: Air temperature, Precipitation, Done by climate station at Finse (1200 m asl)

Current or past data collection: Above ground plant traits, Flower counts, Plot photos, Soil moisture, Soil sampling, Vegetation analyses by sub plot frequencies and % cover

Main genera in OTC plots: Dryas, Sedges, Grasses, Silene, Mosses/Lichens

=== Kilpisjärvi, Finland ===
Name of site leader(s): Anne Tolvanen

University: Natural Resources Institute Finland

Site elevation: 670 m a.s.l.

Latitude (WGS84 decimal degrees): 69.4N

Longitude (WGS84 decimal degrees): 20.490E

Date site was established: 01.06.1994

Does your site have OTC's? Currently have

Number of plots at your site (include OTCs control plots, etc.) 20

When were they established? 1994

Have they been closed? If so, when? running experiment

Is there grazing at your site? Yes, factorial simulated herbivory treatment.

Climate data: Air temperature, Soil temperature

Current or past data collection: Point framing, Herbivory, Soil sampling, GHG fluxes, plant C/N concentrations, soil microbial communities

Main genera in OTC plots: Salix, Betula, Vaccinium, Rushes, Mosses/Lichens

=== Kilpisjärvi II, Finland ===
Name of site leader(s): Friederike Gehrmann

University: University of Helsinki

Site elevation: 700m

Latitude (WGS84 decimal degrees): 69.0443

Longitude (WGS84 decimal degrees): 20.8033

Date site was established: 2014

Does your site have OTC's? Never had

Number of plots at your site (include OTCs control plots, etc.) 24

When were they established? 2014

Have they been closed? If so, when? No

Is there grazing at your site? Yes

Climate data: Air temperature, Soil temperature

Current or past data collection: Phenology, Snowmelt dates, Soil moisture, ecophysiology

Main genera in OTC plots: Salix, Betula, Cassiope, Vaccinium, Saxifraga, Silene

=== Latnjajaure, Sweden ===
Name of site leader(s): Robert Bjork and Mats Bjorkman

University: Göteborg University

Site elevation: 981 m

Latitude (WGS84 decimal degrees): 68.21N

Longitude (WGS84 decimal degrees): 18.31E

Date site was established: 1990 (First full ITEX year 1993)

Does your site have OTC's? Yes

Number of plots at your site (include OTCs control plots, etc.) 50 plots (in 5 plant communities)

When were they established? 1993, 1994, 1996

Have they been closed? If so, when?

Is there grazing at your site? Yes

Climate data: Air temperature, Soil temperature, Snow depth, Precipitation, Cloud cover, Wind, global radiation etc.

Current or past data collection: Phenology, Point framing, Above ground plant traits, Herbivory, Flower counts, Plot photos, Fertilizer plots, Snowmelt dates, Soil moisture, Soil sampling, soil fauna, soil parameters

Main genera in OTC plots: Dryas, Salix, Betula, Cassiope, Vaccinium, Sedges, Grasses, Rushes, Saxifraga, Equisetum, Silene, Cerastium, Oxyria, Draba, Mosses/Lichens, many mosses and lichens determined to species of genera level

=== Paddus, Abisko, Sweden ===
Name of site leader(s): Anders Michelsen

University: University of Copenhagen

==== Mesic tree-line heath ====
Site elevation: 550m

Latitude (WGS84 decimal degrees): 68 19 N

Longitude (WGS84 decimal degrees): 18 51 E

Date site was established: 1989

Does your site have OTC's? Yes

Number of plots at your site (include OTCs control plots, etc.) 48

When were they established? 1989

Have they been closed? If so, when?

Is there grazing at your site? No

Climate data: Air temperature, Soil temperature

Current or past data collection: Phenology, Point framing, Above ground plant traits, Below ground traits, Herbivory, Flower counts, Fertilizer plots, Soil moisture, Soil sampling

Main genera in OTC plots: Dryas, Salix, Betula, Cassiope, Vaccinium, Sedges, Grasses, Equisetum, Silene, Mosses/Lichens

==== Substrate (graminoid-rich heath) ====
Site elevation: 560m

Latitude (WGS84 decimal degrees): 68 19 N

Longitude (WGS84 decimal degrees): 18 50 E

Date site was established: 2012

Does your site have OTC's? Yes

Number of plots at your site (include OTCs control plots, etc.) 30

When were they established? 2012

Have they been closed? If so, when?

Is there grazing at your site? Yes

Climate data: Air temperature, Soil temperature

Current or past data collection: Phenology, Point framing, Above ground plant traits, Below ground traits, Fertilizer plots, Soil moisture, Soil sampling

Main genera in OTC plots: Salix, Betula, Vaccinium, Sedges, Grasses, Rushes, Equisetum, Mosses/Lichens

==== Multe (wet heath) ====
Site elevation: 430m

Latitude (WGS84 decimal degrees): 68 20 N

Longitude (WGS84 decimal degrees): 18 49 E

Date site was established: 1999

Does your site have OTC's? Yes

Number of plots at your site (include OTCs control plots, etc.) 30

When were they established? 1999

Have they been closed? If so, when?

Is there grazing at your site? No

Climate data: Air temperature, Soil temperature

Current or past data collection: Phenology, Point framing, Above ground plant traits, Below ground traits, Fertilizer plots, Soil moisture, Soil sampling

Main genera in OTC plots: Salix, Betula, Vaccinium, Sedges, Grasses, Rushes, Equisetum, Mosses/Lichens

==== Forest (understory in open birch forest) ====
Site elevation: 430m

Latitude (WGS84 decimal degrees): 68 20 N

Longitude (WGS84 decimal degrees): 18 50 E

Date site was established: 2009

Does your site have OTC's? Yes

Number of plots at your site (include OTCs control plots, etc.) 10

When were they established? 2009

Have they been closed? If so, when?

Is there grazing at your site? No

Climate data: Air temperature, Soil temperature

Current or past data collection: Point framing, Above ground plant traits, Below ground traits, Soil moisture, Soil sampling

Main genera in OTC plots: Vaccinium, Grasses, Mosses/Lichens

=== Abisko Torneträsk treeline, Sweden ===
Name of site leader(s): Ellen Dorrepaal

University: Umeå University

Site elevation: 570-775 masl

Latitude (WGS84 decimal degrees): N68°18'-N68°31

Longitude (WGS84 decimal degrees): E18°12'-E18°54'

Date site was established: 2011

Does your site have OTC's? Currently have

Number of plots at your site (include OTCs control plots, etc.) 96

When were they established? 2011

Have they been closed? If so, when? NA

Is there grazing at your site? Yes

Climate data: Air temperature, Soil temperature, Snow depth, Precipitation, Soil moisture

Current or past data collection: Point framing, Above ground plant traits, Soil moisture, Transplant experiments, Nutrients; (Transplanted) seedling survival; Experiment includes OTCs and moss removal treatments for vegetation dominated by three different moss species, across 8 sites along a precipitation gradient

Main genera in OTC plots: Salix, Betula, Vaccinium, Sedges, Grasses, Mosses/Lichens, Empetrum; In general very variable, since the experiment includes 8 sites (one replicate per site) and 3 dominant moss species per site

=== Arvidsjaur, Sweden - forest fire chronosequence ===
Name of site leader(s): Ellen Dorrepaal

University: Umeå University

Site elevation: 424-522 masl

Latitude (WGS84 decimal degrees): N65°35'-N66°07'

Longitude (WGS84 decimal degrees): E17°15'-E19°26'

Date site was established: 2010

Does your site have OTC's? Currently have

Number of plots at your site (include OTCs control plots, etc.) 80

When were they established? 2010

Have they been closed? If so, when? NA

Is there grazing at your site? Yes

Climate data: Air temperature, Soil temperature, Soil moisture

Current or past data collection: Point framing, Above ground plant traits, Below ground traits, Soil moisture, Soil sampling, Transplant experiments, Soil nutrients; Nematodes; Microbial community (PLFA); (Transplanted) seedling survival; Litter decomposition; Experiment consists of OTC x moss removal x shrub removal (full factorial) across 10 sites with varying fire history in the northern boreal forest (Pine/Spruce/Birch), with one treatment replicate per site

Main genera in OTC plots: Vaccinium, Mosses/Lichens, Empetrum

== Central European sites ==
=== Gavia Pass I, Italy ===
Name of site leader(s): Michele Carbognani

University: University of Parma

Site elevation: 2700 m

Latitude (WGS84 decimal degrees): 46.3404

Longitude (WGS84 decimal degrees): 10.4986

Date site was established: 2008

Does your site have OTC's? Currently have

Number of plots at your site (include OTCs control plots, etc.) 20

When were they established? 2008

Have they been closed? If so, when? No

Is there grazing at your site? No

Climate data: Air temperature, Soil temperature

Current or past data collection: Phenology, Point framing, Above ground plant traits, Flower counts, Plot photos, Snowmelt dates, Soil moisture, litter decomposition

Main genera in OTC plots: Salix, Cerastium, Mosses/Lichens, Veronica, Cardamine, Poa, Leucanthemopsis

=== Gavia Pass II, Italy ===
Name of site leader(s): Alessandro Petraglia

University: University of Parma

Site elevation: 2700 m

Latitude (WGS84 decimal degrees): 46.3404

Longitude (WGS84 decimal degrees): 10.4986

Date site was established: 2012

Does your site have OTC's? Currently have

Number of plots at your site (include OTCs control plots, etc.) 18

When were they established? 2012

Have they been closed? If so, when? No

Is there grazing at your site? No

Climate data: Air temperature, Soil temperature, Precipitation, PAR

Current or past data collection: Phenology, Point framing, Flower counts, Snow addition and removal, Snowmelt dates, Soil moisture

Main genera in OTC plots: Salix, Cerastium, Mosses/Lichens, Veronica, Cardamine, Poa, Leucathemopsis

=== Foscagno Pass, Italy ===
Name of site leader(s): Nicoletta Cannone

University: Università dell'Insubria

Site elevation: 2250-2550m

Latitude (WGS84 decimal degrees): 46.04 N

Longitude (WGS84 decimal degrees): 10.02

Date site was established: 2007

Does your site have OTC's? Never had

Number of plots at your site (include OTCs control plots, etc.) 100

When were they established? 2007

Have they been closed? If so, when? running experiment

Is there grazing at your site? No

Climate data: Air temperature, Soil temperature, Precipitation, Snow depth and snow melting

Current or past data collection: Phenology, Above ground plant traits, Flower counts, Plot photos, Fertilizer plots, Snowmelt dates, GIS data, Vegetation data (composition and % coverage)

Main genera in OTC plots: Salix, Vaccinium, Sedges, Grasses, Saxifraga, Silene, Cerastium, Oxyria, Mosses/Lichens

=== Stelvio Pass, Italy ===
Name of site leader(s): Nicoletta Cannone

University: Università dell'Insubria

Site elevation: 2700m

Latitude (WGS84 decimal degrees): 46.31 N

Longitude (WGS84 decimal degrees): 10.25 E

Date site was established: 2014

Does your site have OTC's? Currently have

Number of plots at your site (include OTCs control plots, etc.) 120

When were they established? 2014

Have they been closed? If so, when? running experiment

Is there grazing at your site? No

Climate data: Air temperature, Soil temperature, Snow depth, Precipitation, Snow melting dates

Current or past data collection: Phenology, Above ground plant traits, Flower counts, Plot photos, Snow fences, Fertilizer plots, Snowmelt dates, Soil moisture, GIS data, Soil sampling, Vegetation analyses (composition and % cover)

Main genera in OTC plots: Salix, Sedges, Grasses, Mosses/Lichens

=== Val Bercla, Switzerland ===
Name of site leader(s): Christian Rixen

University: WSL Institute for Snow and Avalanche Research SLF

Site elevation 2500m

Latitude (WGS84 decimal degrees) 46.47

Longitude (WGS84 decimal degrees) 9.58

Date site was established 1994

Does your site have OTC's? Currently have

Number of plots at your site (include OTC's control plots, etc.) 9

When were they established? 1994

Have they been closed? If so, when? No OTCs from 1987 to 2008

Is there grazing at your site? Yes

Does your site collect climate data? If yes, what type? No climate station directly at site but in the general area. Air temperature, Soil temperature, Snow depth, Precipitation, Cloud cover

Current or past data collection at your site:Phenology, Above ground plant traits, Herbivory, Plot photos, Abundance estimates

Main genera in OTC plots: Salix, Sedges, Grasses, Saxifraga, Silene, Mosses/Lichens

=== Stillberg snow manipulation experiment, Switzerland ===
Name of site leader(s): Sonja Wipf and Christian Rixen

University: WSL-Institute for Snow and Avalanche Research SLF

Site elevation: 2220 m

Latitude (WGS84 decimal degrees): 46.77224

Longitude (WGS84 decimal degrees): 9.86569

Date site was established: 2003

Does your site have OTC's? No Snow removal

Number of plots at your site (include OTCs control plots, etc.) 21

When were they established? 2004

Have they been closed? If so, when? No but since 2006 maintained with minimal effort (snow manipulation done, not many measurements). Vegetation does not show much response.

Is there grazing at your site? No

Climate data: Air temperature >1m, Soil temperature, Snow depth, Snowmelt date, Precipitation, PAR, Wind speed, Wind direction, Solar radiation, Weather station <500m away

Current or past data collection: Individual plant phenology, Plot photos, Plant abundance measure (other than point framing), Lichen cover, Bryophyte cover, Litter bags, Individual growth

Main genera in OTC plots: Vaccinium, Empetrum, Rhododendron, Carex, Loiseleuria, Helictotrichum

=== Jakobshorn, Davos, Switzerland ===
Name of site leader(s): Janet Prevey

University: Pacific Northwest Research Station

Site elevation: 2320 m

Latitude (WGS84 decimal degrees): 46.77

Longitude (WGS84 decimal degrees): 9.86

Date site was established: 2014

=== Pyrenees, Spain ===
Name of site leader(s): Estela Illa Bachs, Benjamin Komak, Olivier Argagnon and Ludovic Olicard

University: Universitat de Barcelona

==== Ulldeter ====
Site elevation: 2400 m

Latitude (WGS84 decimal degrees): 42.41926

Longitude (WGS84 decimal degrees): 2.24756

Date site was established: 2018

Does your site have OTC's?Yes

Number of plots at your site (include OTCs control plots, etc.) 8

When were they established?2019

Have they been closed? If so, when?

Is there grazing at your site? No

Climate data:Air temperature >1m, Snow depth, Precipitation, Wind speed, Solar radiation, Air temperature (near ground, ~10 cm), Snowmelt date

Current or past data collection: Snapshot phenology, Point framing, Above ground plant traits, Plot photos, Plant tissue nutrient composition, Soil (physical texture), Soil (chemical nutrient composition), Species Abundance and Phenology

Main genera in OTC plots: Salix, Poa, Agrostis, Gentiana, Nardus, Trifolium

==== Ratera ====
Site elevation: 2560 m

Latitude (WGS84 decimal degrees): 42.6053

Longitude (WGS84 decimal degrees): 0.96021

Date site was established: 2016

Does your site have OTC's? Yes

Number of plots at your site (include OTCs control plots, etc.) 8

When were they established? 2017

Have they been closed? If so, when? No

Is there grazing at your site? Ungulates

Climate data: Air temperature (near ground, ~10 cm), Snowmelt date

Current or past data collection: Point framing, Above ground plant traits, Plot photos, Plant tissue nutrient composition, Soil (physical texture), Soil (chemical nutrient composition) Species Abundance and Phenology

Main genera in OTC plots: Salix, Carex, Poa, Bryophytes, Agrostis, Nardus

==== Envalira ====
Site elevation: 2500 m

Latitude (WGS84 decimal degrees): 42.52372

Longitude (WGS84 decimal degrees): 1.73507

Date site was established: 2017

Does your site have OTC's?Yes

Number of plots at your site (include OTCs control plots, etc.) 8

When were they established? 2017

Have they been closed? If so, when? No

Is there grazing at your site? No

Climate data: Air temperature (near ground, ~10 cm)

Current or past data collection: Point framing, Above ground plant traits, Plot photos, Plant tissue nutrient composition, Soil (physical texture), Soil (chemical nutrient composition) Species Abundance and Phenology

Main genera in OTC plots: Salix, Carex, Poa, Agrostis, Gentiana, Nardus, Sibbaldia

==== Arrious ====
Site elevation: 2370 m

Latitude (WGS84 decimal degrees): 42.84143

Longitude (WGS84 decimal degrees): -0.33682

Date site was established: 2017

Does your site have OTC's? Yes

Number of plots at your site (include OTCs control plots, etc.) 8

When were they established? 2017

Have they been closed? If so, when? No

Is there grazing at your site? Unknown

Climate data: Air temperature (near ground, ~10 cm), Snowmelt date

Current or past data collection: Point framing, Above ground plant traits, Plant tissue nutrient composition, Soil (physical texture), Soil (chemical nutrient composition) Species Abundance and Phenology

Main genera in OTC plots: Salix, Festuca, Gentiana, Trifolium

=== Cataperdís (Andorra), Spain ===
Name of site leader(s): Estela Illa Bachs, Benjamin Komak, Empar Carrillo Ortuño, Josep Maria Ninot Sugrañes, Alba Anadon Rosell, Aaron Pérez Haase, and Oriol Grau Fernández

University: Universitat de Barcelona

Site elevation: 2535 m

Latitude (WGS84 decimal degrees): 42.61678

Longitude (WGS84 decimal degrees): 1.48186

Date site was established: 2017

Does your site have OTC's? Yes

Number of plots at your site (include OTCs control plots, etc.) 16

When were they established? 2019

Have they been closed? If so, when? No

Is there grazing at your site? No

Climate data: Air temperature (near ground, ~10 cm), Snowmelt date

Current or past data collection: Point framing, Above ground plant traits, Plot photos, Below ground microbe surveys, Plant tissue nutrient composition, Litter bags, Soil (physical texture), Soil (chemical nutrient composition), Species Abundance and Phenology, OTCs, Snow removal

Main genera in OTC plots: Salix, Poa, Bryophytes, Lichen, Sibbaldia, Leontodon (= Scorzoneroides)

== Asian sites ==
=== Changbai Mountains, Northeast China ===
Changbai Mountains, Northeast China:

Name of site leader(s): Shengwei Zong, Hongshi He; 2015-ongoing, Zhengfang Wu; 2009-ongoing, Haibo Du; 2009-ongoing, and Xu Jiawei; 2008-ongoing

University: Northeast Normal University

Site elevation: 2300 m

Latitude (WGS84 decimal degrees): 72

Longitude (WGS84 decimal degrees): 42

Date site was established: 2009

Does your site have OTC's? Yes OTCs and Fertilizer (2013), Snow removal (2019), Vegetation removal (2018)

Number of plots at your site (include OTCs control plots, etc.)128

When were they established? 2011

Have they been closed? If so, when? No

Is there grazing at your site? No

Climate data: Air temperature >1m, Soil temperature, Precipitation, Solar radiation, Wind speed, Wind direction, Soil moisture probe

Current or past data collection: Above ground plant traits, Plot photos, Plant abundance measure (other than point framing), Above ground biomass harvest, Below ground biomass harvest, Soil (physical texture), Soil (chemical nutrient composition) Fine-scale geospatial data (GPS points for each plot), Drone images, Phenocams of site (GoPros etc.), Reciprocal transplant experiment

Main genera in OTC plots: Dryas, Salix, Vaccinium, Rhododendron, Carex, Festuca, Poa, Juncus, Oxyria, Lycopodium, Bryophytes, Lichen, Oxytropis

== American sites ==
=== Barrow/Utqiagvik and Atqasuk ===
Barrow/Utqiagvik and Atqasuk:

Name of site leader(s): Christian Bay 1994–1995, Patrick Webber 1995–2007, Robert Hollister 2007-current

University: Grand Valley State University

==== Barrow/Utqiagvik Dry Site ====
Site elevation: 5m

Latitude (WGS84 decimal degrees): 71.31502696

Longitude (WGS84 decimal degrees): -156.6010247

Date site was established: 1994

Does your site have OTC's? Yes OTCs

Number of plots at your site (include OTCs control plots, etc.) 48

When were they established? 1994

Have they been closed? If so, when? No

Is there grazing at your site? Insects, Rodents, Birds

Climate data: Air temperature 10 cm, Air temperature >1m, Soil temperature, Snowmelt date, Precipitation, PAR, Wind speed, Wind direction, Soil moisture probe, Active layer depth

Current or past data collection: Plot level phenology, Individual plant phenology, Snapshot phenology, Point framing, Above ground plant traits, Below ground plant traits, Flower counts (total), Flower counts (per stage), Plot photos, Phenocams (GoPros etc.), Transplant experiments, Multispectral data, CO_{2} Flux, Methane Flux, Plant abundance measure (other than point framing), Lichen cover, Bryophyte cover, Plant tissue nutrient composition, Above ground biomass harvest, Below ground biomass harvest, Litter bags Fine-scale geospatial data (GPS points for each plot), Drone images, Multispectral data, Phenocams of site (GoPros etc.), Reciprocal transplant experiment, Dark diversity (species richness), Taxonomic classification of bryophytes

Main genera in OTC plots: Salix, Cassiope, Carex, Eriophorum, Poa, Saxifraga, Cerastium, Stellaria, Papaver, Draba, Bryophytes, Lichen

==== Barrow/Utqiagvik Wet Site ====
Site elevation: 3 m

Latitude (WGS84 decimal degrees): 71.31051842

Longitude (WGS84 decimal degrees): -156.5978987

Date site was established: 1995

Does your site have OTC's? Yes OTCs

Number of plots at your site (include OTCs control plots, etc.) 48

When were they established? 1995

Have they been closed? If so, when? No

Is there grazing at your site? Insects, Rodents, Birds

Climate data: Air temperature 10 cm, Soil temperature, Snowmelt date, Soil moisture probe, Active layer depth

Current or past data collection: Plot level phenology, Individual plant phenology, Snapshot phenology, Point framing, Above ground plant traits, Flower counts (total), Flower counts (per stage), Plot photos, Phenocams (GoPros etc.), Multispectral data, CO_{2} Flux, Plant abundance measure (other than point framing), Lichen cover, Bryophyte cover, Litter bags Fine-scale geospatial data (GPS points for each plot), Drone images, Multispectral data, Phenocams of site (GoPros etc.), Dark diversity (species richness), Taxonomic classification of bryophytes

Main genera in OTC plots: Salix, Carex, Eriophorum, Poa, Saxifraga, Cerastium, Stellaria, Draba, Cardamine, Bryophytes

==== Atqasuk Dry Site ====
Site elevation: 22 m

Latitude (WGS84 decimal degrees): 70.45373011

Longitude (WGS84 decimal degrees): -157.4073879

Date site was established: 1996

Does your site have OTC's? Yes

Number of plots at your site (include OTCs control plots, etc.) 48

When were they established? 1996

Have they been closed? If so, when?

Is there grazing at your site? Insects, Ungulates, Rodents, Birds

Climate data: Air temperature 10 cm, Air temperature >1m, Soil temperature, Snowmelt date, Precipitation, PAR, Wind speed, Wind direction, Soil moisture probe, Active layer depth

Current or past data collection:Plot level phenology, Individual plant phenology, Snapshot phenology, Point framing, Above ground plant traits, Flower counts (total), Flower counts (per stage), Plot photos, Phenocams (GoPros etc.), Multispectral data, CO_{2} Flux, Plant abundance measure (other than point framing), Lichen cover, Bryophyte cover, Plant tissue nutrient composition, Above ground biomass harvest, Litter bags Fine-scale geospatial data (GPS points for each plot), Drone images, Multispectral data, Phenocams of site (GoPros etc.), Dark diversity (species richness), Taxonomic classification of bryophytes

Main genera in OTC plots: Salix, Cassiope, Vaccinium, Carex, Poa, Bryophytes, Lichen

==== Atqasuk Wet Site ====
Site elevation: 17 m

Latitude (WGS84 decimal degrees): 70.45303348

Longitude (WGS84 decimal degrees): -157.4003018

Date site was established: 1996

Does your site have OTC's? Yes

Number of plots at your site (include OTCs control plots, etc.) 48

When were they established? 1996

Have they been closed? If so, when? No

Is there grazing at your site? Insects, Ungulates, Rodents

Climate data: Air temperature 10 cm, Soil temperature, Snowmelt date, Soil moisture probe, Active layer depth Air temperature (near ground, ~10 cm), Soil temperature, Snowmelt date, Soil moisture probe, Active layer depth

Current or past data collection: Plot level phenology, Individual plant phenology, Snapshot phenology, Point framing, Above ground plant traits, Flower counts (total), Flower counts (per stage), Plot photos, Phenocams (GoPros etc.), Multispectral data, CO_{2} Flux, Lichen cover, Bryophyte cover, Litter bags Fine-scale geospatial data (GPS points for each plot), Drone images, Multispectral data, Phenocams of site (GoPros etc.), Dark diversity (species richness), Taxonomic classification of bryophytes

Main genera in OTC plots: Salix, Betula, Carex, Eriophorum, Bryophytes, Lichen

=== Toolik and surrounding area (Shaver) ===
Toolik and surrounding area (Shaver): Name of site leader(s): GR Shaver

University: Ecosystems Center, MBL

Subsites: Toolik Historic Site, Imnavait Sites, ARC LTER sites - many local sites and experiments, all within about 25 km of Toolik Lake. We break these down by vegetation type, including Moist acidic tussock tundra, Moist nonacidic tussock tundra, moist nonacidic nontussock tundra, dry heath tundra, wet sedge tundra, and deciduous shrub tundra. Much of the data on these sites is available at the ARC LTER web site at: http://ecosystems.mbl.edu/arc/

Date site was established: 1976

Does your site have OTC's? Yes OTCs (1982) and Fertilizer (1982), Herbivory exclosure (1996), Vegetation removal (1995), Shade treatments

When were they established? Dates above are dates of first expt, new experiments with same treatments established at various dates in the 1980s-2000s

Have they been closed? If so, when? No

Is there grazing at your site? Insects, Ungulates, Rodents, Birds

Climate data:Air temperature >1m, Soil temperature, Snow depth, Snowmelt date, Precipitation, Cloud cover, PAR, Wind speed, Wind direction, Soil moisture probe, Soil moisture (% water by weight), Active layer depth, Solar radiation, UV

Current or past data collection: Plot level phenology, Individual plant phenology, Point framing, Above ground plant traits, Below ground plant traits, Flower counts (total), Flower counts (per stage), Plot photos, Transplant experiments, Below ground microbe surveys, Multispectral data, Above ground invertebrates, Below ground invertebrates, CO_{2} Flux, Methane Flux, Plant abundance measure (other than point framing), Lichen cover, Bryophyte cover, Plant tissue nutrient composition, Above ground biomass harvest, Below ground biomass harvest, Litter bags, Soil (physical texture), Soil (chemical nutrient composition), Lots of soil chemistry, plant allometry and vegetative and sexual demography Fine-scale geospatial data (GPS points for each plot), Multispectral data, Common garden experiment, Reciprocal transplant experiment

Note: Many protocols established before ITEX; some ITEX protocols developed from ours

Main genera in OTC plots: Dryas, Salix, Betula, Cassiope, Vaccinium, Empetrum, Rhododendron, Carex, Eriophorum, Festuca, Poa, Juncus, Saxifraga, Silene, Cerastium, Stellaria, Papaver, Oxyria, Draba, Cardamine, Equisetum, Lycopodium, Ferns, Bryophytes, Lichen, Astragalus, Oxytropis, Rubus, Above checked spp occur at >50% occurrence at at least one local site but none at every site

=== Toolik Lake, Alaska (Gough) ===
Name of site leader(s): Laura Gough, Ed Rastetter, Donie Bret-Harte

University: MBL Woods Hole, University of Alaska, Towson University

Site elevation: 730 m

Latitude (WGS84 decimal degrees): 68 deg 38 min N

Longitude (WGS84 decimal degrees): 149 deg 34 min W

Date site was established: 1976

Does your site have OTC's? No

Number of plots at your site (include OTCs control plots, etc.) hundreds

When were they established? 1976-2006

Have they been closed? If so, when?

Is there grazing at your site? Yes

Climate data: Air temperature, Soil temperature, Snow depth, Precipitation, Cloud cover, PAR, radiation balance, uv

Current or past data collection: Phenology, Point framing, Above ground plant traits, Below ground traits, Herbivory, Flower counts, Plot photos, Snow fences, Snow addition and removal, Fertilizer plots, Snowmelt dates, Soil moisture, GIS data, Soil sampling, NPP GPP, bulk CNP stocks and turnover

Main genera in OTC plots: Salix, Betula, Cassiope, Vaccinium, Sedges, Grasses, Rushes, Mosses/Lichens, NO OTCs—plastic greenhouses. 5 contrasting veg types

=== Alaska Ecotypes/Alaska Eriophorum vaginatum Transplant Garden ===
Name of site leader(s): Ned Fetcher 2014–present, Jim Tang 2014-present, Michael Moody 2014–present

University: Wilkes University, Marine Biological Laboratory, University of Texas - El Paso

This is a reciprocal transplant experiment using three populations, Sagwon, Toolik, Lake, and Coldfoot. Each plot contains three tussocks of Eriophorum vaginatum that were transplanted in August 2014. At Sagwon and Toolik Lake, half of the plots had OTC's beginning in July 2015.

==== Toolik Lake ====
Site elevation: 763 m

Latitude (WGS84 decimal degrees): 68.62886

Longitude (WGS84 decimal degrees): -149.576521

Date site was established: 2011, 2014

Does your site have OTC's? Currently have

Number of plots at your site (include OTCs control plots, etc.) 72

When were they established? 24 in 2011, 48 in 2014

Have they been closed? If so, when?

Is there grazing at your site? No

Climate data: Air temperature 10 cm, Air temperature >1m, Soil temperature, Snow depth, Snowmelt date, Precipitation, Cloud cover, PAR, Wind speed, Wind direction, Active layer depth, Solar radiation, Data available from Toolik Field Station website

Current or past data collection: Individual plant phenology, Snapshot phenology, Above ground plant traits, Below ground plant traits, Flower counts (total), Plot photos, Phenocams (GoPros etc.), Transplant experiments, CO_{2} Flux, Litter bags Fine-scale geospatial data (GPS points for each plot), Drone images, Phenocams of site (GoPros etc.), Common garden experiment, Reciprocal transplant experiment

Main genera in OTC plots: Salix, Betula, Cassiope, Vaccinium, Empetrum, Rhododendron, Carex, Eriophorum, Bryophytes, Lichen, Rubus

==== Sagwon ====
Site elevation: 297m

Latitude (WGS84 decimal degrees): 69.4239

Longitude (WGS84 decimal degrees): -148.7008

Date site was established: 2014

Does your site have OTC's? Currently have

Number of plots at your site (include OTCs control plots, etc.) 48

When were they established? 2015

Have they been closed? If so, when?

Is there grazing at your site? No

Climate data: Air temperature >1m, Soil temperature, Snow depth, Snowmelt date, Precipitation, Wind speed, Wind direction, Solar radiation, Data is available from USDA SNOTEL website

Current or past data collection: Individual plant phenology, Above ground plant traits, Below ground plant traits, Plot photos, Transplant experiments, Litter bags Fine-scale geospatial data (GPS points for each plot), Common garden experiment, Reciprocal transplant experiment

Main genera in OTC plots: Salix, Betula, Vaccinium, Rhododendron, Carex, Eriophorum, Bryophytes, Lichen, Rubus

==== Coldfoot ====
Site elevation: 320 m

Latitude (WGS84 decimal degrees): 67.2586

Longitude (WGS84 decimal degrees): -150.1698

Date site was established: 2014

Does your site have OTC's? Never had

Number of plots at your site (include OTCs control plots, etc.) 24

When were they established? 2014

Have they been closed? If so, when? NA

Is there grazing at your site? No

Climate data: Air temperature >1m, Soil temperature, Snow depth, Snowmelt date, Precipitation, Wind speed, Wind direction, Solar radiation, Data are available from the USDA-SNOTEL website.

Current or past data collection: Individual plant phenology, Above ground plant traits, Plot photos, Litter bags Fine-scale geospatial data (GPS points for each plot), Common garden experiment, Reciprocal transplant experiment

Main genera in OTC plots: Salix, Betula, Vaccinium, Rhododendron, Carex, Eriophorum, Bryophytes, Lichen, Rubus

=== Toolik Lake (Welker and Oberbauer) ===
Name of site leader(s): Jeffrey M Welker and Steven F Oberbauer

University: Florida International University

==== Toolik Moist ====
Site elevation: 720 m

Latitude (WGS84 decimal degrees): 68.62

Longitude (WGS84 decimal degrees): -149.603

Date site was established: 1994

Does your site have OTC's? Yes OTCs, Snow fences

When were they established? 1994

==== Toolik Dry ====
Site elevation: 720 m

Latitude (WGS84 decimal degrees): 68.62

Longitude (WGS84 decimal degrees): -149.598

Date site was established: 1994

Does your site have OTC's? Yes OTCs, Snow fences

When were they established? 1994

==== Toolik Snowfield ====
Latitude (WGS84 decimal degrees): 68.62

Longitude (WGS84 decimal degrees): -149.601

Does your site have OTC's? Yes OTCs

=== Imnaviat Creek, Alaska ===
Name of site leader(s): Jeremy May and Steven Oberbauer

University: Florida International University

==== Dry Heath ====
Site elevation: 927m asl

Latitude (WGS84 decimal degrees): 68 37' N

Longitude (WGS84 decimal degrees): 149 18' W

Date site was established: 2016

Does your site have OTC's? Currently have

Number of plots at your site (include OTCs control plots, etc.) 16

When were they established? June 2016

Have they been closed? If so, when? No

Is there grazing at your site? No

Climate data: No

Current or past data collection: Point framing, Plot photos, NDVI

Main genera in OTC plots: Dryas, Salix, Betula, Cassiope, Vaccinium, Sedges, Grasses, Saxifraga, Mosses/Lichens

==== Wet Acidic ====
Site elevation: 927 m asl

Latitude (WGS84 decimal degrees): 68 37' N

Longitude (WGS84 decimal degrees): 149 18' W

Date site was established: 2016

Does your site have OTC's? Currently have

Number of plots at your site (include OTCs control plots, etc.) 16

When were they established? June 2016

Have they been closed? If so, when? No

Is there grazing at your site? No

Climate data: No

Current or past data collection: Point framing, Plot photos, NDVI

Main genera in OTC plots: Salix, Betula, Cassiope, Vaccinium, Sedges, Grasses, Saxifraga, Mosses/Lichens

=== Alaska Ice Cut ===
Name of site leader(s): Ellen Dorrepaal

University: Umeå University

Site elevation: 385 m asl

Latitude (WGS84 decimal degrees): N69°048'

Longitude (WGS84 decimal degrees): W148°836'

Date site was established: 2014

Does your site have OTC's? Currently have

Number of plots at your site (include OTCs control plots, etc.) 24

When were they established? 2014 (snow fences), 2016 (OTCs)

Have they been closed? If so, when? NA

Is there grazing at your site? No

Climate data: Air temperature, Soil temperature, Snow depth, Thaw depth; Soil moisture

Current or past data collection: Point framing, Above ground plant traits, Snow fences, Soil moisture, Drones, NDVI; Ecosystem Respiration; GPP

Main genera in OTC plots: Salix, Betula, Vaccinium, Sedges, Mosses/Lichens, Ledum, Rubus

=== White Mountains ===
Name of site leader(s):Christopher Kopp

University: University of British Columbia

==== Fellfield ====
Site elevation: 3100 m

Latitude (WGS84 decimal degrees): 37.5

Longitude (WGS84 decimal degrees): -118.17

Date site was established: 2013

Does your site have OTC's? No

==== Shrubland ====
Site elevation: 3700 m

Latitude (WGS84 decimal degrees): 37.5

Longitude (WGS84 decimal degrees): -118.17

Date site was established: 2013

Does your site have OTC's? No

=== Niwot Ridge ===
Name of site leader(s):Sarah Elmendorf

University: University of Colorado, Boulder

==== Dry Fellfield ====
Site elevation: 3535 m

Latitude (WGS84 decimal degrees): 40.0548849

Longitude (WGS84 decimal degrees): -105.5880266

Does your site have OTC's? No

==== Dry Meadow ====
Site elevation: 3529 m

Latitude (WGS84 decimal degrees): 40.0554251

Longitude (WGS84 decimal degrees): -105.5888966

Does your site have OTC's? No

==== Moist Meadow ====
Site elevation: 3525 m

Latitude (WGS84 decimal degrees): 40.05473969

Longitude (WGS84 decimal degrees): -105.5901614

Does your site have OTC's? No

==== Moist Shrub Tundra ====
Site elevation: 3528 m

Latitude (WGS84 decimal degrees): 40.05619788

Longitude (WGS84 decimal degrees): -105.589602

Does your site have OTC's? Yes

==== Snowbed ====
Site elevation: 3537 m

Latitude (WGS84 decimal degrees): 40.0569184

Longitude (WGS84 decimal degrees): -105.5908668

Does your site have OTC's? No

==== Snow Fence ====
Site elevation: 3524 m

Latitude (WGS84 decimal degrees): 40.05659895

Longitude (WGS84 decimal degrees): -105.5895581

Does your site have OTC's? No

== Southern hemisphere sites ==
=== Antarctica ===
Name of site leader(s): Nicoletta Cannone

University: Università dell'Insubria

==== Edmonson Point ====
Site elevation: 5–35 m

Latitude (WGS84 decimal degrees): 74°19'S

Longitude (WGS84 decimal degrees): 165°08'E

Date site was established: 2014

Does your site have OTC's? No, but it does have precipitation shields, nutrient additions, and long-term monitoring without manipulations

Number of plots at your site (include OTCs control plots, etc.) 88

When were they established? 2014

Have they been closed? If so, when? No

Is there grazing at your site? No

Climate data: Soil temperature

Current or past data collection: Point framing, Plot photos, Snow fences, Fertilizer plots, Snowmelt dates, Soil sampling, Vegetation coverage and floristic composition

Main genera in OTC plots: Mosses/Lichens

==== Finger Point ====
Site elevation: 50m

Latitude (WGS84 decimal degrees): 77°00'S

Longitude (WGS84 decimal degrees): 162°26'E

Date site was established: 2014

Does your site have OTC's? No, but it does have precipitation shields, nutrient additions, and long-term monitoring without manipulations

Number of plots at your site (include OTCs control plots, etc.) 36

When were they established? 2014

Have they been closed? If so, when? No ongoing experiment

Is there grazing at your site? No

Climate data: Air temperature, Soil temperature

Current or past data collection: Point framing, Plot photos, Snow fences, Fertilizer plots, Snowmelt dates, Soil sampling, vegetation coverage and floristic composition

Main genera in OTC plots: Mosses/Lichens

==== Apostrophe Island ====
Site elevation: 50m

Latitude (WGS84 decimal degrees): 73°31'S

Longitude (WGS84 decimal degrees): 167°25'E

Date site was established: 2014

Does your site have OTC's? No, but it does have precipitation shields, nutrient additions, and long-term monitoring

Number of plots at your site (include OTCs control plots, etc.) 36

When were they established? 2014

Have they been closed? If so, when? No, ongoing experiment

Is there grazing at your site? No

Climate data: Air temperature, Soil temperature

Current or past data collection: Point framing, Plot photos, Snow fences, Fertilizer plots, Snowmelt dates, Soil sampling, vegetation coverage and floristic composition

Main genera in OTC plots: Mosses/Lichens

==== Tarn Flat ====
Site elevation: 20m

Latitude (WGS84 decimal degrees): 74°59'S

Longitude (WGS84 decimal degrees): 162°37'E

Date site was established: 2014

Does your site have OTC's? No, but it does have precipitation shields, nutrient additions, and long-term monitoring

Number of plots at your site (include OTCs control plots, etc.) 36

When were they established? 2014

Have they been closed? If so, when? No, ongoing experiment

Is there grazing at your site? No

Climate data: Soil temperature

Current or past data collection: Point framing, Plot photos, Snow fences, Fertilizer plots, Snowmelt dates, Soil sampling, vegetation coverage and floristic composition

Main genera in OTC plots: Mosses/Lichens

==== Boulder Clay ====
Site elevation: 150 m

Latitude (WGS84 decimal degrees): 74°44'S

Longitude (WGS84 decimal degrees): 164°01'E

Date site was established: 2014

Does your site have OTC's? No, but it does have precipitation shields, nutrient additions, and long-term monitoring

Number of plots at your site (include OTCs control plots, etc.) 36

When were they established? 2014

Have they been closed? If so, when? No, ongoing experiment

Is there grazing at your site? No

Climate data: Air temperature, Soil temperature, Snow depth

Current or past data collection: Point framing, Plot photos, Snow fences, Fertilizer plots, Snowmelt dates, Soil sampling, vegetation coverage and floristic composition

Main genera in OTC plots: Mosses/Lichens

=== Falkland Islands ===
Name of site leader(s): Stef Bokhorst (previously R. Aerts, P. Convey and A. Huiskes (all in 2003))

University: VU Amsterdam

Site elevation: 2 m

Latitude (WGS84 decimal degrees): -51.76

Longitude (WGS84 decimal degrees): -59.03

Date site was established: 2003

Does your site have OTC's? Yes

Number of plots at your site (include OTCs control plots, etc.) 24

When were they established? 2003

Have they been closed? If so, when? No

Is there grazing at your site? Birds

Climate data: No full monitoring only during 2003-2005

Current or past data collection: Point framing, Plot photos, Litter bags, Soil (chemical nutrient composition)

Main genera in OTC plots: Empetrum, Ferns, Bryophytes, Lichen

=== Anchorage Island ===
Name of site leader(s): Stef Bokhorst (previously R. Aerts, P. Convey and A. Huiskes)

University: VU Amsterdam

Site elevation: 30 m

Latitude (WGS84 decimal degrees): -67.61

Longitude (WGS84 decimal degrees): -68.22

Date site was established: 2004

Does your site have OTC's? Yes OTCs and Fertilizer (2015)

Number of plots at your site (include OTCs control plots, etc.) 12

When were they established? 2004

Have they been closed? If so, when? No

Is there grazing at your site? No

Climate data:Air temperature >1m, Wind speed, Wind direction, Solar radiation, Soil temperature, full soil temp, PAR, and relative humidity during 2004-2007

Current or past data collection: Point framing, Plot photos, Belowground microbial surveys, Multispectral data, Belowground invertebrates, CO_{2} Flux, Lichen cover, Bryophyte cover, Soil (chemical nutrient composition), Taxonomic classification of lichens, Taxonomic classification of bryophytes

Main genera in OTC plots: Bryophytes, Lichen

=== Reserva Ecológica Antisana ===
Name of site leader(s): Priscilla Muriel, Francisco Cuesta

University: Pontificia Universidad Católica del Ecuador

Site elevation: 4580 m

Latitude (WGS84 decimal degrees): 0°28'1.50"S

Longitude (WGS84 decimal degrees): 78° 9'43.00"W

Date site was established: August 2013

Does your site have OTC's? Yes

Number of plots at your site (include OTCs control plots, etc.) 25 control plots, 25 OTC plots (2013), 7 OTC+phenology plots and 7 corresponding control plots (2017)

When were they established? August 2013

Have they been closed? If so, when? No

Is there grazing at your site? Yes

Climate data: Air temperature, Soil temperature; Since 2018, precipitation, radiation (PAR), soil water content

Current or past data collection: Phenology, Above-ground plant traits, Flower counts, Plot photos; Planned: soil sampling, herbivory

Main genera in OTC plots: Páramo (tropical alpine vegetation) species

== See also ==
- International Polar Year
- Global warming
