= Itex =

Itex may refer to:

- IT Examiner, an Indian I.T. web site
- Itex, a fictitious firm in Maximum Ride: Saving the World and Other Extreme Sports
- iTeX, a fictitious XML-based successor to TeX announced by Donald Knuth at the TUG 2010 Conference

== See also ==
- iText, a free online Mozilla Public License open source library
- International Tundra Experiment (ITEX)
