= World Association of Young Scientists =

The World Association of Young Scientists (WAYS; formerly the World Academy of Young Scientists) is a global network of young scientists established in 2004, in partnership with UNESCO and ICSU. It provides a Web 2.0 platform for scientific exchange, thereby linking individuals and existing networks with a regional or disciplinary focus.

== History ==
At the World Conference on Science in Budapest in 1999, the International Forum of Young Scientists identified a need to promote the involvement of younger generation of scientists in the dialogue between government authorities, parliaments, educational institutions and to develop national science policies taking into consideration needs, opportunities and perspectives of young researchers. To that end, a World Academy of Young Scientists was proposed, to serve as a resource and network for young scientists and to harness their energy and expertise. This idea was further developed with the support of UNESCO and ICSU, culminating in the first General Assembly of WAYS in Marrakesh in 2004.

The 1st World Academy of Young Scientists General Assembly, jointly organized by UNESCO in cooperation with ISESCO, the World Academy of Sciences (TWAS), the Ministry of National Education, Higher Education, Executive Training and Scientific Research, Morocco and the Morocco UNESCO National Commission, was held in Marrakesh from 11 to 13 December 2004. 150 young researchers from 87 countries attended the meeting. In the framework of the WAYS's 1st General Conference, a Round Table on "Science contributing to the dialogue among civilization: the young scientists perspective" was also organized. On that occasion, it was strongly recognized that dialogue is a constituent element present in science and particularly highlighted the requirements of communication and mutual understanding for science cooperation.

In 2005, WAYS held a meeting in Budapest as a satellite to the World Science Forum.

At the Third World Science Forum in 2007, WAYS was renamed as the World Association of Young Scientists, to reflect its development as a network of scientists as opposed to an academy.

== Activities ==
WAYS fosters communication among young scientists through its web portal, and leverages activities by linking up projects that can benefit from the energy and attention of young scientists.

== Partnerships and Collaborations ==
See also: Permafrost Young Researchers Network, Eurodoc, The Scholar Ship
