= Frost line =

Depth groundwater in soil is expected to freeze

The frost line—also known as frost depth or freezing depth—is most commonly the depth to which the groundwater in soil is expected to freeze. The frost depth depends on the climatic conditions of an area, the heat transfer properties of the soil and adjacent materials, and on nearby heat sources. For example, snow cover and asphalt insulate the ground and homes can heat the ground (see also heat island). The line varies by latitude, it is deeper closer to the poles. The maximum frost depth observed in the contiguous United States ranges from 0 to 8 feet (2.4 m). Below that depth, the temperature varies, but is always above 0 °C (32 °F).

Alternatively, in Arctic and Antarctic locations the freezing depth is so deep that it becomes year-round permafrost, and the term "thaw depth" is used instead. Finally, in tropical regions, frost line may refer to the vertical geographic elevation below which frost does not occur.

Frost front refers to the varying position of the frost line during seasonal periods of freezing and thawing.

== Building codes ==
Building codes take frost depth into account because of frost heaving, which can damage buildings by moving their foundations. For this reason, foundations are generally built below the frost depth. Water and sewage pipes are typically buried below the frost line to prevent them from freezing. Alternatively, pipes may be insulated or heated using heat tape or similar products to allow for shallower depths. Due to additional cost, this method is typically only used where deeper trenching is not an option due to utility conflicts, shallow bedrock, or other conditions that make deeper excavation infeasible.

There are many ways to predict frost depth, including factors related to air temperature, soil temperature, and soil properties.

== Sample frost lines for various locations ==
- United States
  - Ohio (2018)
    - Columbus, Ohio: 32 inches (0.8 m)
  - Minnesota (2007):
    - Northern counties: 5 feet (1.5 m)
    - Southern counties: 3.5 feet (1.1 m)
  - Washington (2023)
    - Edmonds, WA: 18 inches (0.46 m)
    - Spokane, WA: 24 inches (0.61 m)
- Canada: Can use table of estimates based on freezing index degree days.
  - Ontario: Map of frost penetration depths for Southern Ontario.
    - Ottawa: 1.8 metres (5.9 ft)
    - Windsor: 1.0 metre (3.3 ft)
