= NICOP =

NICOP may refer to:

- National Identity Card for Overseas Pakistanis
- Ninth International Conference on Permafrost
- N. D. Popescu-Popnedea, Romanian author
