= Cryoturbation =

Mixing of soil horizons due to freezing and thawing

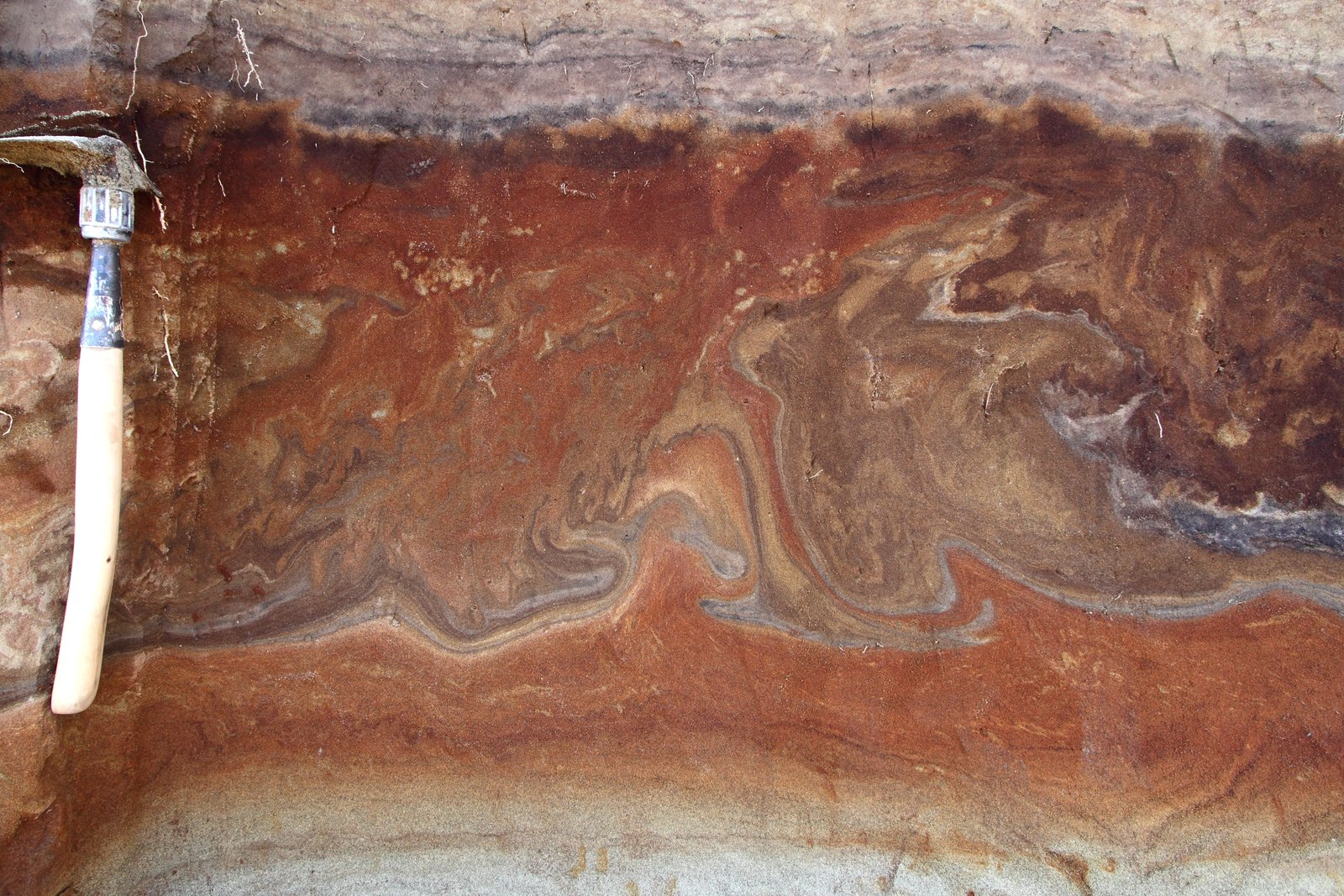
Cut-away section of soil, showing movement of soil layers due to cryoturbation.

In gelisols (permafrost soils), cryoturbation (frost churning) refers to the mixing of materials from various horizons of the soil down to the bedrock due to freezing and thawing.

Cryoturbation occurs to varying degrees in most gelisols. The cause of cryoturbation lies in the way in which the repeated freezing of the soil during autumn causes the formation of ice wedges at the most easily erodible parts of the parent rock. If the parent rock is hard, this can cause quite deep erosion of the rock over many years. As this process continues, during the summer when an active layer forms in the soil this eroded material can easily move both from the soil surface downward and from the permafrost table upward.

As this process occurs, the upper soil material gradually dries out (because the soil moisture moves from the warm surface layer to the colder layer at the top of the permafrost) so that it forms a granular structure with many very distinctive crystalline shapes (such as ice lenses). Separation of coarse from fine soil materials produces distinctive patterned ground with different types of soil.

The extent of cryoturbation in gelisols varies considerably: it occurs much more on exposed sites (where turbels dominate everywhere) than in sheltered sites such as valleys (where orthels are not significantly affected by cryoturbation form).

== See also ==
- Pedology
- Soil classification
