= Gelisol =

Permafrost soils

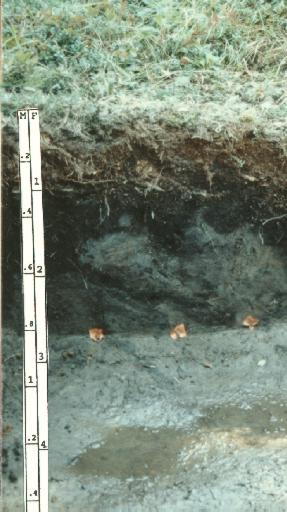
- A gelisol profile
- Used in: USDA soil taxonomy
- Profile: OAC
- Key process: cryoturbation
- Parent material: peat, other
- Climate: subarctic, tundra

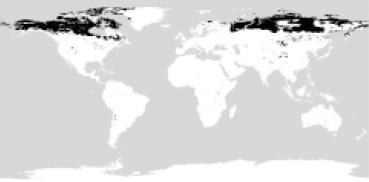
Gelisols of the world

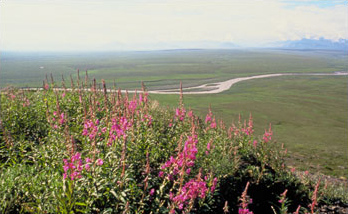
Arctic Tundras are the typical environment for the formation of gelisols

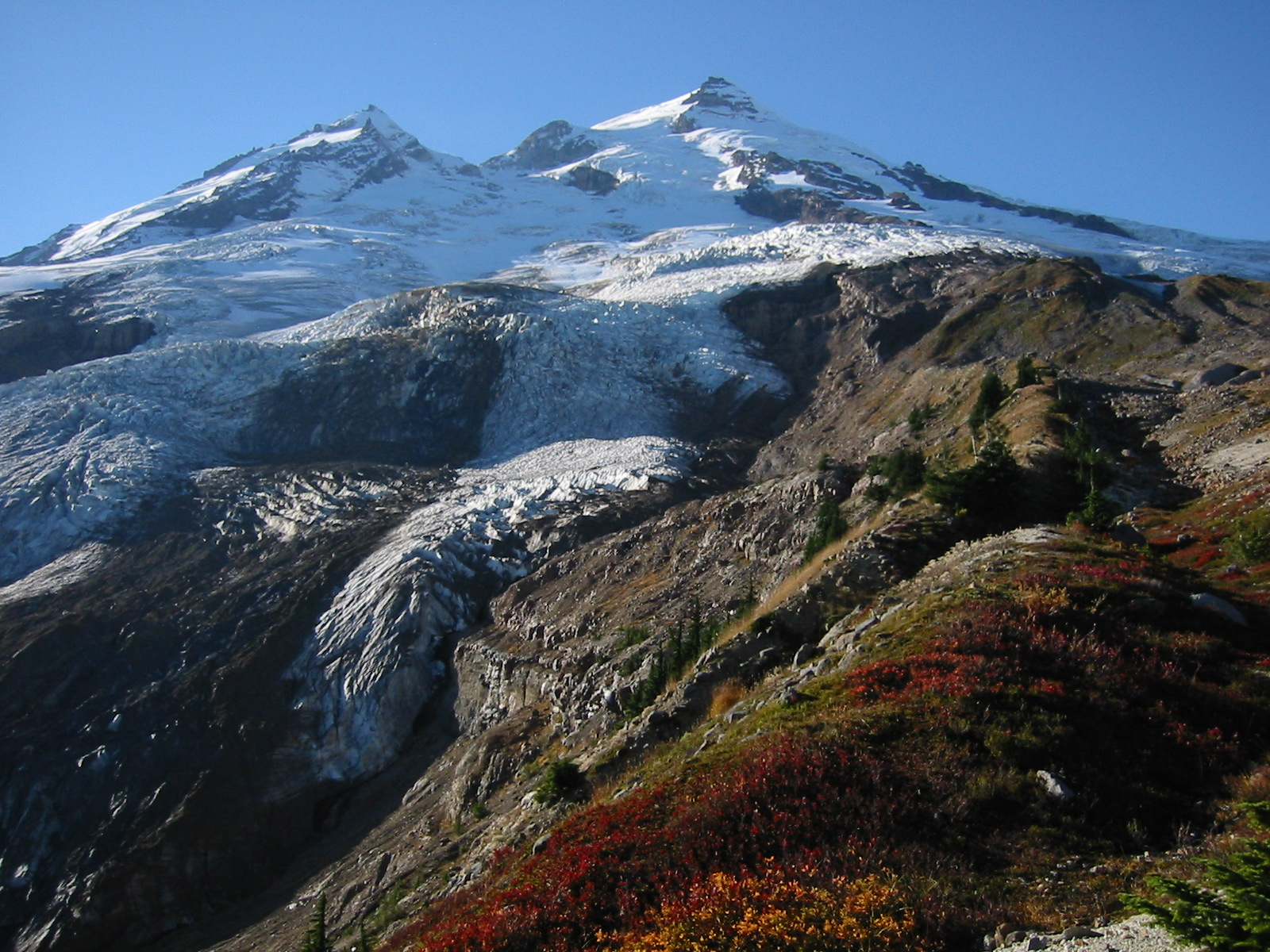
Other gelisols are observed in Alpine Tundras

Gelisols are an order in USDA soil taxonomy. They are soils of very cold climates which are defined as containing permafrost within two meters (6 ft 7 in) of the soil surface.

== Description ==
The word "gelisol" comes from the Latin gelare meaning "to freeze", a reference to the process of cryoturbation that occurs from the alternating thawing and freezing characteristic of gelisols.

In the World Reference Base for Soil Resources (WRB), most gelisols belong to the cryosols. In soil taxonomy, gelisols key out before the histosols. In the WRB, the histosols key out before the cryosols. Organic permafrost soils are therefore gelisols (histels) in the soil taxonomy and histosols (cryic histosols) in the WRB.

Structurally, gelisols may have a B horizon and more commonly have an A horizon and/or O horizon resting on the permafrost. Because soil organic matter accumulates in the upper layer, most gelisols are black or dark brown in soil color, followed by a shallow mineral layer. Despite the influence of glaciation in most areas where gelisols occur, chemically they are not highly fertile because nutrients, especially calcium and potassium, are very easily leached above the permafrost. The permafrost greatly restricts the engineering use of gelisols, as large structures (e.g. buildings) subside as the frozen earth thaws when they are put in place.

Gelisols are found chiefly in Siberia, Alaska and Canada. Smaller areas are found in the Andes (mainly near the intersection between Chile, Bolivia and Argentina), Tibet, northern Scandinavia and the ice-free parts of Greenland and Antarctica. Fossil gelisols are known from as far back as Precambrian ice ages 900 million years ago.

== Suborders ==
In USDA soil taxonomy, Gelisols are subdivided into:

- Histels: organic soils similar to histosols except that they have permafrost within two meters (6 ft 7 in) below ground surface. They have 80% or more organic materials from the soil surface to a depth of 50 cm (20 in) or to a glacic layer or densic, lithic, or paralithic contact, whichever is shallowest. These soils occur predominantly in subarctic and low arctic regions of continuous or widespread permafrost. Less than one-third of the active layer (the soil between the ground surface and a permafrost table) or an ice layer which is at least 30 cm (12 in) thick has been cryoturbated.
- Turbels: soils that show marked influence of cryoturbation (more than one-third of the depth of the active layer) such as irregular, broken, or distorted horizon boundaries and involutions and areas with patterned ground. They commonly contain tongues of mineral and organic horizons, organic and mineral intrusions, and oriented rock fragments. Organic matter is accumulated on top of the permafrost, and ice or sand wedges are common features. Turbels occur primarily in the zone of continuous permafrost.
- Orthels: soils that show little or no cryoturbation (less than one-third of the depth of the active layer). Patterned ground (except for polygons) generally is lacking. Orthels occur primarily within the zone of discontinuous permafrost, and in alpine areas.

== See also ==
- Active layer
- Pedogenesis
- Pedology (soil study)
- Soil classification
