= Permafrost Young Researchers Network =

PYRN's official logo. It is a reminder of a typical temperature curve describing permafrost occurrence

The Permafrost Young Researcher’s Network (PYRN) is a network formed in 2005 to formally facilitate and strengthen contacts among young scientists in the permafrost community. It arose from the need for an integrated single source of information for specific resources vital to young scientists (fellowships, conference travel funding, position opportunities, etc.). Additionally, the imminence of the International Polar Year (IPY) prompted the need for a visible representation of the young permafrost community at the international level. The Permafrost Young Researchers Network has therefore been formally established within the International Permafrost Association (IPA) framework and has created and maintains means of communication among young researchers involved in permafrost research. It reports on young researchers’ activities to the IPA membership and working parties and represents permafrost scientists and engineers within broader international and national assemblages.

== Activities ==
The PYRN website is hosted by the Arctic Portal . On the site information on conferences, events, job and graduate positions, research and other topics related to permafrost science is available. It distributes an electronic newsletter to the young researchers’ communities related to the aforementioned topics and seeks to promote and publicize research undertaken by young researchers. PYRN membership is now up to 1100+ members with as many as 50 countries involved (11/07/2014). An Expression of Intent to the International Polar Year was submitted and PYRN will take part in this major event under the auspices of the International Permafrost Association.

== See also ==
- Association of Polar Early Career Scientists
