= International Permafrost Association =

Environmental Organisation

- IPA
- Abbreviation: IPA
- Formation: 1983; 43 years ago
- Type: International nongovernmental organization
- Region served: Worldwide
- Official language: English, French
- Parent organization: International Union of Geological Sciences
- Website: Official website

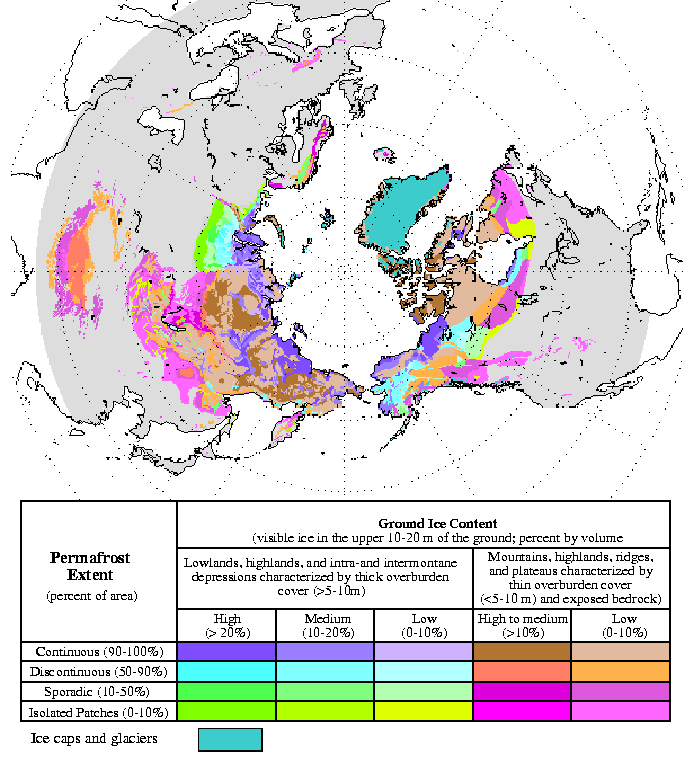
Extent of permafrost in the Northern Hemisphere.

The International Permafrost Association (IPA), founded in 1983, is an international professional body formed to foster the dissemination of knowledge concerning permafrost and to promote cooperation among individuals and national or international organisations engaged in scientific investigation and engineering work related to permafrost and seasonally frozen ground. The IPA became an Affiliated Organisation of the International Union of Geological Sciences in July 1989.

The Association’s primary responsibilities are to convene International Permafrost Conferences, undertake special projects such as preparing databases, maps, bibliographies, and glossaries, and coordinate international field programmes and networks. The International Conference On Permafrost (ICOP) is regularly held since 1965.

== International Conference on Permafrost (ICOP) ==
The first International conference (ICOP) was held at West Lafayette, Indiana, United States, in 1963, followed by Yakutsk, Siberia (1975); Edmonton, Canada (1978); Fairbanks, Alaska (1983); Trondheim, Norway (1988); Beijing, China (1993); Yellowknife, Canada (1998); and Zurich, Switzerland (2003: ICOP 2003). The Ninth International Conference on Permafrost (NICOP) was held in Fairbanks, Alaska, June 29-July 3, 2008 and the Tenth took place in Salekhard, Russia, June 25–29, 2012 (TICOP 2012). The Eleventh International Conference on Permafrost was held in Potsdam, Germany, June 20-14, 2016.

The 12th International Conference on Permafrost was planned in Lanzhou, China, with the conference theme Permafrost environments under persistent warming: Challenges for scientific assessment and engineering practice. Due to the Covid-19 pandemic, it was postponed until June 20–24, 2022. This ICOP 2022 will take place in Lanzhou, China. The 13th International Conference on Permafrost is planned June 16–20, 2024 in Whitehorse, Yukon, Canada at Yukon University. Field excursions are an integral part of each conference, and are organised by the host country. Regional conferences are organised between the main conferences (in Europe, Russia, China).

== Organization and structure ==
Membership is through adhering national or multinational organisations or as Associate Members in countries where no Adhering Body exists. The IPA is governed by an Executive Committee and a Council consisting of representatives from 26 Adhering Bodies having interests in some aspect of theoretical, basic and applied frozen ground research, including permafrost, periglacial phenomena, seasonal frost, and artificial ground freezing. Members are: Argentina, Austria, Canada, China, Denmark, Finland, France, Germany, Iceland, Italy, Japan, Kyrgyzstan, Mongolia, The Netherlands, New Zealand, Norway, Poland, Portugal, Romania, Russia, South Korea, Spain, Sweden, Switzerland, United Kingdom, United States of America. News from the IPA members are posted on the IPA webpage.

The officers of the seven-member Executive Committee (2012–2016) are:

- President: Antoni Lewkowicz (Canada)
- Vice Presidents: Hanne Christiansen (Norway) and Vladimir Romanovsky (US)
- Members: Hugues Lantuit (Germany), Lothar Schrott (Austria), Dmitry Sergeev (Russia) and Ma Wei (China)

The Executive Director is Inga May.

The IPA Constitution provides for three categories of Working Group Parties: standing committees (long-term), working groups (5–10 years) and action groups (1–2 years) that organise and coordinate research activities and special projects. The first category includes a Standing Committee for Data, Information and Communication, an International Advisory Committee for the International Permafrost Conferences, and a Standing Committee for Education and Outreach. There are ten Working Groups, each with two co-chairs and some with subgroups. These are:

- Antarctic Permafrost and Periglacial Environments
- Coastal and Offshore Permafrost
- Cryosol
- Glacier and Permafrost Hazards in High Mountains
- Isotopes and Geochemistry of Permafrost
- Mapping and Modelling of Mountain Permafrost
- Periglacial Landforms, Processes, and Climate
- Permafrost and Climate
- Permafrost Astrobiology
- Permafrost Engineering

The International Secretariat is based at the Alfred Wegener Institute for Polar and Marine Research under the direction of Inga May (Germany). Annual membership contributions are used for producing and distributing Frozen Ground, and support of Working Parties and committee activities and representations at international meetings.

== Publication and Information ==
Proceedings of peer-reviewed papers are produced for each International Permafrost Conference by the host country, as are field trip guidebooks. The Frozen Ground news bulletin is published annually and has a distribution of over 2500. Current and back issues are posted online.

The association releases tools and references publications related to permafrost, including a Circum-Arctic Map of Permafrost and Ground-Ice Conditions" at a scale of 1:10,000,000, prepared by an international team and published in the Circum-Pacific map series in 1997, a CD-ROM compilation of global frozen ground data and information, an online bibliography of the world's literature on permafrost, and a 1998 illustrated glossary of permafrost and related ground-ice terms in 12 languages.

The IPA cooperates with the American Geological Institute by providing literature to its Cold Regions Bibliography Project.

== Recent and future activities ==
IPA was involved in the International Polar Year (IPY) by participating with four coordinated projects. The Thermal State of Permafrost (TSP) proposes to obtain a 'snapshot' of permafrost temperatures throughout Planet Earth during the period 2007–2008. Another objective of TSP is to establish a permanent International Network of Permafrost Observatories (INPO) within the framework of the Global Terrestrial Network for Permafrost (GTN-P). The three other IPY projects are concerned with Antarctic and sub-Antarctic Permafrost, Periglacial and Soil Environments (ANTPAS), the Arctic Circum-Polar Coastal Observatory Network (ACCO-Net), and Carbon Pools in Permafrost Regions (CAPP), and revised regional permafrost maps of Central Asia and the Nordic region.

Several regional permafrost and soils conferences have been held, including:

- The First European Conference on Permafrost (EUCOP I) in Rome (Italy), in 2001.
- The Second European Conference on Permafrost (EUCOP II) in Potsdam (Germany), in June 2005.
- The Fourth International Conference on Cryopedology in Arkhangelsk (Russia), in August 2005.
- The Asian Conference on Permafrost in Lanzhou (China), in early August 2006, with a field excursion to the Qinghai-Tibet Plateau.
- The Third European Conference on Permafrost (EUCOP III) in July 2010 in Longyearbyen, Svalbard, Norway.
- The Fourth European Conference on Permafrost (EUCOP IV) in June 2014, hosted by the University of Évora in collaboration with the University of Lisbon, Portugal.

== Other major activities ==
The IPA coordinates and cooperates with several other major international programmes and organizations.

Global Terrestrial Network for Permafrost (GTN-P) is a WMO network for monitoring of the active layer and the Thermal State of Permafrost (TSP). The IPA manages the GTN-P. The Circumpolar Active Layer Monitoring (CALM) program has 125 reporting stations, and TSP has identified over 800 boreholes; both include a total of over 15 participating countries.

Arctic Coastal Dynamics (ACD) is a joint programme with the International Arctic Science Committee (IASC), the International Geosphere-Biosphere Programme (IGBP), and the Land-Ocean Interactions in the Coastal Zone (LOICZ) programme to estimate the organic carbon content and mineral transfer for eroding permafrost onto the Arctic shelves. The IPA collaborates with the International Union for Quaternary Research (INQUA).

The IPA has a Memorandum of Understanding with the Climate and Cryosphere (CliC) programme of the World Climate Research Programme (WCRP). The main areas of cooperation are on the roles of permafrost on water and carbon balances, and data assimilation and modelling.

Beginning in 1995, the IPA and the International Geographical Union (IGU) developed an Agreement of Cooperation, thus making IPA an affiliate of the IGU. The current IGU collaboration is within its Commission on Cold Regions Environments.

Coordination of activities on permafrost, soils and periglacial environments of the Antarctic and sub-Antarctic islands is a joint programme with an Expert Group of the Scientific Committee for Antarctic Research (SCAR).

Activities related to glaciers and permafrost hazards (GAPHAZ) in the high mountains are a joint activity with the International Union of Geodesy and Geophysics (IUGG)] and its newly designated Commission for the Cryospheric Sciences.

The topic of carbon sources and sinks in cold regions soils (cryosols) and permafrost is a joint program with the Global Carbon Project (GPC) and the joint working group on Cryosol of the International Union of Soil Sciences (IUSS).
