= Paralithic =

A paralithic horizon is a weathered layer of bedrock. The term comes from the Greek words para, meaning "akin to", and lithic, meaning "stony".
