= Sonja Wipf =

Swiss climate scientist

Sonja Wipf (born 24 February 1973, Brugg) is a Swiss plant ecologist who studies the consequences of climate change. She worked at the WSL Institute for Snow and Avalanche Research SLF and is head of research and monitoring at the Swiss National Parks.

== Life ==
After graduating from the Old Cantonal School Aarau, Wipf studied botany and environmental science at the University of Zurich from 1993 to 2000. She completed a doctoral dissertation about the effects of reduced snow cover on tundra ecosystems in 2006 at the University.

== Work ==
Wipf's research deals with the effects of climate change, agriculture, and tourism on alpine and arctic plants and soils, and their interactions. Her work has been published in leading journals Nature and Climatic Change. With her colleagues, Wipf demonstrated the accelerated responses of alpine ecosystems to climate change.

Wipf appears in the media on a regular basis. In the context of the climate crisis, her work has been reported by national and international media.

Since 1 January 2020 Wipf has headed the Research and Monitoring Department at the Swiss National Parks.

In April 2025, Wipf joined University of Basel Department of Environmental Sciences Ecology team as a senior scientists/postdoc. Additionally, in November 2025, she has founded the Luzula Biodiversity Knowledge Gmbh that research, appreciates, protects, and experiences biodiversity.

== Selected publications ==
- With Christian Rixen: A review of snow manipulation experiments in Arctic and alpine tundra ecosystems. In: Polar Research. 29(1), 2010, S. 95–109.
- With Christian Rixen, Markus Fischer, Bernhard Schmid, Veronika Stoeckli: Effects of ski piste preparation on alpine vegetation. In: Journal of Applied Ecology. 42(2), 2005, S. 306–316.
- With Veronika Stoeckli, Peter Bebi: Winter climate change in alpine tundra: plant responses to changes in snow depth and snowmelt timing. In: Climatic Change. 94(1–2), 2009, S. 105–121.
