= Natural Resources Institute Finland =

Finnish research institute

- Luonnonvarakeskus (Luke)

Agency overview
- Formed: 2015-01-01
- Jurisdiction: Finland
- Headquarters: Latokartanonkaari 9, 00790 Helsinki, Finland; 60°13′43″N 25°1′4″E
- Employees: 1323 (2022)
- Annual budget: €147M
- Agency executive: Johanna Buchert, President and CEO
- Parent agency: Ministry of Agriculture and Forestry
- Website: luke.fi

Natural Resources Institute Finland (Luke) (Finnish: Luonnonvarakeskus) is a Finnish research institute under the Ministry of Agriculture and Forestry that started its operations on January 1, 2015. When formed, it was the second largest research institute in Finland following VTT. It formed by merging the Agrifood Research Finland, the Finnish Forest Research Institute, the Finnish Game and Fisheries Research Institute and the statistics production of the Information Centre of the Ministry of Agriculture and Forestry.

The CEO of Luke for the five-year term starting on September 10, 2018, is Johanna Buchert. She was preceded by Mari Walls, who became rector of the University of Tampere.

== Tasks ==
According to the law on the Natural Resources Institute Finland, its field of business is the promotion of competitive economic activity based on the sustainable use of renewable natural resources, as well as the promotion of well-being and rural vitality. The mission of the center is to carry out scientific research and development activities in its field, produce information and expert services to support social decision-making and official activities, carry out knowledge and technology transfer, produce statistics and maintain registers. Tasks related to the preservation of the diversity of genetic resources and the promotion of international cooperation are also included in the prescribed tasks for the research institute.

== Research themes ==
Luke's research is grouped into four research programs:

- Profitable and responsible primary production
- Circular bioeconomy
- Climate-Smart Carbon Cycle
- Adaptive and resilient bioeconomy

In addition, Luke has a program focusing on statutory and expert services.

== Locations ==
The management center of Luke is located in Helsinki on the Viikki Campus. According to its Regional Operations Strategy, Luke has four main offices: the headquarters in Helsinki, Jokioinen, Joensuu and Oulu. In addition, there are more than 20 research infrastructures in the provinces.
