= Thaw depth =

In soil science, the thaw depth or thaw line is the instantaneous level down to which the soil has warmed to zero degrees Celsius. The active layer thickness is the maximum thaw depth over a period of two years.

The layer of soil over the thaw depth is called the active layer, while the soil below is called permafrost.

The term frost front refers to the varying position of the thaw line during the periods of freezing/thawing.

The knowledge of the thaw depth is important for the two major reasons: its influence on the ecology and on construction (buildings, pipelines, roads, etc.). These influences are mediated by the effects of the dynamics biological, pedologic, geomorphologic, biogeochemical, and hydrologic processes in permafrost.

In ecology, roots of plants cannot penetrate beyond the active layer, which places restrictions on which plants can grow in permafrost.

In construction, the thaw depth is a major factor in ensuring the structural integrity of the objects in question.

The primary factor that determines the thaw depth is the maximal air temperature. The soil type is another important factor: coarser textures of the parent material have higher thermal conductivity, and, e.g., sandy soils have much deeper thaw line than clays. Other factors are the vegetation and the percentage of the soil organic matter, which influence the bulk density of the soil, and hence thermal conductivity.
