= Active layer =

Layer of topsoil above permafrost

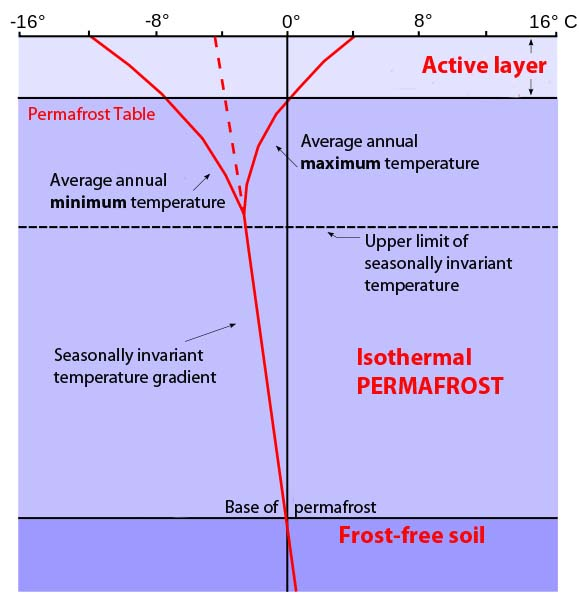
The red dotted-to-solid line depicts the average temperature profile with depth of soil in a permafrost region. The trumpet-shaped lines at the top show seasonal maximum and minimum temperatures in the "active layer", which commences at the depth where the maximum annual temperature intersects 0 °C. The active layer is seasonally frozen. The middle zone is permanently frozen as "permafrost". And the bottom layer is where the geothermal temperature is above freezing. Note the importance of the vertical 0 °C line: It denotes the bottom of the active layer in the seasonally variable temperature zone and the bottom limit of permafrost as the temperature increases with depth.

In environments containing permafrost, the active layer is the top layer of soil that thaws during the summer and freezes again during the autumn. In all climates, whether they contain permafrost or not, the temperature in the lower levels of the soil will remain more stable than that at the surface, where the influence of the ambient temperature is greatest. This means that, over many years, the influence of cooling in winter and heating in summer (in temperate climates) will decrease as depth increases.

If the winter temperature is below the freezing point of water, a frost front will form in the soil. This "frost front" is the boundary between frozen and unfrozen soil, and with the coming of spring and summer, the soil is thawed, always from the top down. If the heating during summer exceeds the cooling during winter, the soil will be completely thawed during the summer and there will be no permafrost. This occurs when the mean annual temperature is above 0 °C (32 °F), but also occurs when the mean annual temperature is slightly below 0 °C on sites exposed to the sun with coarse-textured parent materials (vegetation).

When there is not sufficient heat to thaw the frozen soil completely, permafrost forms. The active layer in this environment consists of the top layers of soil which thaws during the summer, while the inactive layer refers to the soil below which is frozen year-round because the heat fails to penetrate. Liquid water cannot flow below the active layer, with the result that permafrost environments tend to be very poorly drained and boggy.

== Thaw depth in permafrost areas ==
The thickness of the active layer is the average annual thaw depth in permafrost areas, due to solar heating of the surface.

Thus, the primary determinant of active layer thickness is the maximum temperature attained during the summer. If it is only a little above 0 °C, the active layer can be very thin (only 10 cm on Ellesmere Island), whilst if it is quite warm, it is much thicker (about 2.5 m at Yakutsk), and if the permafrost is discontinuous and soil begins thawing earlier, it can be still thicker (5 meters at Yellowknife). The parent material of the soil is also important: active layers in soils made of sandy or gravelly parent materials can be up to five times deeper than those made from loam- or clay-rich parent material. This is because the coarser material allows for much greater conductivity of heat down into the soil.

This is important because roots of plants cannot penetrate beyond the active layer and are restricted by its thickness. Thus, in a continuous permafrost environment plants must have shallow roots, which restricts tree growth to specialised species such as Larix. In areas of discontinuous permafrost, most conifers are able to grow easily.

== Soil formation in the active layer ==
Cryoturbation is the dominant force operating in the active layer, and tends to make it generally uniform in composition throughout. However, variation in the composition of soils due to differences in parent rock are very marked in permafrost regions due to the low rate of weathering in the very cold climate.

The slow rate of decomposition of organic material means gelisols (permafrost soils) are very important as a sink for carbon dioxide. This carbon dioxide and other greenhouse gases (chiefly methane) forms from the very slow decomposition of the excess organic matter that remains in most gelisols and is mixed down into the pereletok layer during relatively hot summers and below that layer during warmer periods about 5000 to 6000 years ago. This storage of carbon means thawing of permafrost may accelerate global warming - some suggest the difference could become very significant especially if the carbon has been stored since before the recent glacial maxima.

== Pereletok ==
Pereletok is a layer of frozen ground that remains frozen for multiple summers but eventually thaws. Pereletok generally occurs in permafrost areas, but can also be found in areas not underlain by permafrost. It is distinguished from permafrost because permafrost is ground that remains frozen relatively permanently. The distinction between pereletok and permafrost does not seem to be universally defined and practically speaking, distinguishing the two in the field is difficult. Sometimes three distinct types of frozen ground are identified based on how long they remain frozen: 1) permafrost (permanently frozen), 2) pereletok (frozen for multiple years, and 3) seasonally frozen ground.

Because of its relatively short period in frozen form, pereletok can be considered a portion of the active layer that remains frozen for an unusually long period due to a particularly cool summer or particularly cold winter.

Pereletok is a Russian word that translates to “that which survives over the summer” and is also known as intergelisol.
